This is a list of multilateral treaties entered into by Australia.

Pre-federation multilateral treaties 
Treaties prior to federation signed by the British Empire, adopted by Australia, and active on or after federation:
 1856 – Declaration respecting Maritime Law (Paris, 16 April 1856)
 1868 – Declaration renouncing the Use, in Time of War, of Explosive Projectiles under 400 Grams Weight (St Petersburg, 11 December 1868)
 1884 – Convention for the Protection of Submarine Telegraph Cables (Paris, 14 March 1884)
 1886 – Convention for the Creation of an International Union for the Protection of Literary and Artistic Works, Additional Article and Final Protocol (Berne, 9 September 1886)
 1888 – Convention respecting the Free Navigation of the Suez Maritime Canal (Constantinople, 29 October 1888)
 1896 – Additional Act modifying the International Convention for the Creation of an International Union for the Protection of Literary and Artistic Works, and Final Protocol, of 9 September 1886 (Paris, 4 May 1896)
 1899 – International Convention for the Pacific Settlement of International Disputes [Hague I] (The Hague, 29 July 1899)
 1899 – International Convention with respect to the Laws and Customs of War on Land [Hague II] (The Hague, 29 July 1899)
 1899 – International Convention for Adapting to Maritime Warfare the Principles of the Geneva Convention of 22 August 1864 [Hague III] (The Hague, 29 July 1899)

1901–1922 multilateral treaties 
Federation to after World War I
 1902 – International Sanitary Convention [for preventing the introduction and spread of the Plague]
 1903 – International Telegraphic Convention
 1904 – Universal Postal Convention, Final Protocol and Detailed Regulations
 1907 – Additional Act modifying the International Convention for the Protection of Industrial Property of 20 March 1883
 1907 – ATS 1907 No 7 Declaration Prohibiting the Use of Expanding Bullets [dum-dums – Hague Declaration III]
 1907 – Declaration Prohibiting the Use of Asphyxiating Gases [Hague Declaration II]
 1907 – International Convention for the Amelioration of the Condition of the Wounded and Sick in Armies in the Field [Red Cross Convention]
 1909 – International Sanitary Convention [on Cholera and the Plague]
 1909 – International Declaration Prohibiting the Discharge of Projectiles and Explosives from Balloons [Hague XIV]
 1909 – International Agreement respecting the Creation of an International Office of Public Health
 1910 – Convention for the Creation of an International Institute of Agriculture
 1910 – International Convention respecting the Limitation of the Employment of Force for the Recovery of Contract Debts [Hague II]
 1910 – International Convention relative to the Opening of Hostilities [Hague III]
 1910 – International Convention concerning the Laws and Customs of War on Land [Hague IV]
 1910 – International Convention relative to the Status of Enemy Merchant Ships at the Outbreak of Hostilities [Hague VI]
 1910 – International Convention relative to the Conversion of Merchant Ships into Warships [Hague VII]
 1910 – International Convention relative to the Laying of Automatic Submarine Contact Mines [Hague VIII]
 1910 – International Convention respecting Bombardments by Naval Forces in Time of War [Hague IX]
 1910 – International Convention relative to Certain Restrictions on the Exercise of the Right of Capture in Maritime War [Hague XI]
 1912 – International Convention for the Protection of Literary and Artistic Works
 1912 – International Agreement for the Suppression of the Circulation of Obscene Publications
 1913 – International Radiotelegraphic Convention, Final Protocol and Service Regulations
 1913 – Convention respecting Measures for the Preservation and Protection of the Fur Seals in the North Pacific Ocean
 1913 – International Radiotelegraph Convention, Final Protocol and Detailed Service Regulations
 1914 – Additional Protocol to the International Convention for the Protection of Literary and Artistic Works of 13 November 1908, and Protocol of Signature
 1915 – Convention respecting the Compilation of International Commercial Statistics, and Protocol
 1915 – Protocol respecting the Putting into Force of the International Opium Convention of 23 January 1912
 1919 – International Convention respecting the Prohibition of the Use of White (Yellow) Phosphorus in the Manufacture of Matches
 1919 – Agreement between the Allied and Associated Powers with regard to the Contributions to the Cost of Liberation of the Territories of the Former Austro-Hungarian Monarchy
 1919 – Agreement between the Allied and Associated Powers with regard to the Italian Reparation Payments
 1919 – Declaration modifying [Articles 4 and 5 of] the Agreement between the Allied and Associated Powers with regard to the Contributions to the Cost of Liberation of the Territories of the Former Austro-Hungarian Monarchy
 1919 – Declaration modifying [Article 4 of] the Agreement between the Allied and Associated Powers with regard to the Italian Reparation Payments of 10 September 1919
 1920 – Treaty of Peace between the Allied and Associated Powers and Germany
 1920 – Mandate for the Administration of the German Possessions in the Pacific Ocean situated South of the Equator other than German Samoa and Nauru
 1920 – Treaty of Peace between the Allied and Associated Powers and Austria; Protocol, Declaration and Special Declaration
 1920 – Treaty of Peace between the Allied and Associated Powers and Bulgaria, and Protocol
 1920 – Treaty between the Principal Allied and Associated Powers and Czechoslovakia [Czechoslovak Minorities Treaty]
 1920 – Treaty between the Principal Allied Powers and Denmark concerning Slesvig [Schleswig]
 1920 – Agreement between Belgium, the British Empire, France and the United States of America, and Germany, with regard to the Military Occupation of the Territories of the Rhine
 1920 – Treaty of Peace with Poland [Polish Minorities Treaty]
 1920 – Treaty between the Principal Allied and Associated Powers and Roumania [Romanian Minorities Treaty]
 1920 – Treaty between the Principal Allied and Associated Powers and the Serb-Croat-Slovene State [Yugoslav Minorities Treaty]
 1920 – Agreement [between Australia, New Zealand and United Kingdom of Great Britain and Ireland] relating to Nauru
 1920 – Convention revising the General Act of Berlin of 26 February 1885 and the General Act and Declaration of Brussels of 2 July 1890
 1920 – Convention relating to the Liquor Traffic in Africa, and Protocol
 1920 – Additional Protocol to the International Convention relative to Air Navigation of 13 October 1919
 1920 – International Opium Convention
 1921 – Treaty between the Principal Allied and Associated Powers and Poland, Roumania, the Serb-Croat-Slovene State and the Czechoslovak State relative to Certain Frontiers of those States
 1921 – Protocol of Signature of the Statute of the Permanent Court of International Justice
 1921 – Protocol amending Paragraphs 12 and 19 of Annex II to Part VIII of the Treaty of Peace between the Allied and Associated Powers and Germany of 28 June 1919
 1921 – Treaty of Peace between the Allied and Associated Powers and Hungary, Protocol and Declaration
 1922 – International Convention relative to Air Navigation
 1922 – Declaration on the Application of Article 5 of the International Convention relative to Air Navigation of 13 October 1919
 1922 – Convention regarding the Organisation of the Campaign against Locusts
 1922 – Declaration recognizing the Right to a Flag of States having no Sea Coast
 1922 – International Convention for the Suppression of the Traffic in Women and Children

1923–1939 multilateral treaties 
 1923 – International Sanitary Convention
 1923 – International Convention for the Creation at Paris of an International Institute of Refrigeration
 1923 – Treaty between the British Empire, France, Japan and the United States of America relating to their Insular Possessions and Insular Dominions in the Pacific Ocean, and Declaration
 1923 – Treaty Supplementary to the Treaty relating to Insular Possessions and Insular Dominions in the Pacific Ocean of 13 December 1921
 1923 – Treaty between the British Empire, the United States of America, France, Italy and Japan, for the Limitation of Naval Armament
 1923 – Protocol [between the British Empire, France and Italy, and Bulgaria] for Arrangements for Reparation Payments by Bulgaria
 1923 – Agreement [between Australia, New Zealand and United Kingdom] regarding Nauru
 1924 – Treaty between the Principal Allied and Associated Powers, and Greece, concerning the Protection of Minorities in Greece
 1924 – Treaty between the Principal Allied and Associated Powers, and Greece, concerning Thrace
 1924 – Protocol relating to the Treaty concluded at Sèvres between the Principal Allied Powers and Greece on the 10th August 1920, concerning the protection of Minorities in Greece, and to the Treaty concluded on the same day between the same powers relating to Thrace
 1924 – Treaty of Peace [with Turkey]
 1924 – Convention relating to the Regime of the Straits
 1924 – Convention respecting the Thracian Frontiers
 1924 – Convention respecting Conditions of Residence and Business and Jurisdiction (Turkey)
 1924 – Declaration of Amnesty, and Protocol (Turkey)
 1924 – Protocol relating to Certain Concessions granted in the Ottoman Empire, and Declaration by Turkey
 1924 – Protocol relating to the Accession of Belgium and Portugal to Certain Provisions of Instruments signed at Lausanne, and Declarations by Belgium and Portugal
 1924 – Protocol relating to the Karagatch Territory and the Islands of Imbros and Tenedos
 1924 – Protocol relating to Signature by the Serb-Croat-Slovene State
 1924 – Protocol of an Amendment to Article 6 [last paragraph] of the Covenant of the League of Nations of 28 June 1919
 1924 – Protocol of an Amendment to Article 12 of the Covenant of the League of Nations of 28 June 1919
 1924 – Protocol of an Amendment to Article 13 of the Covenant of the League of Nations of 28 June 1919
 1924 – Protocol of an Amendment to Article 13 of the Covenant of the League of Nations of 28 June 1919
 1924 – Protocol concerning the Settlement by means of a Lump Sum of the Cost of the Inter-Allied Occupation in Bulgaria
 1924 – Agreement between the Allied Governments and the German Government concerning the Agreement between the Reparation Commission and the German Government of 9 August 1924
 1924 – Agreement between the Allied Governments and the German Government to carry out the Experts' [Dawes] Plan of 9 April 1924
 1924 – Inter-Allied Agreement to carry out the Experts' [Dawes] Plan of 9 April 1924
 1924 – Protocol amending Paragraph 13 of Annex II to Part VIII of the Treaty of Peace between the Allied and Associated Powers and Germany of 28 June 1919
 1924 – Agreement between the Governments represented on the Reparation Commission to modify Annex II [new paragraphs 2A and 16A, amended paragraph 17] to Part VIII of the Treaty of Peace between the Allied and Associated Powers and Germany of 28 June 1919
 1925 – Universal Postal Convention, Final Protocol and Final Protocol rectifying Final Protocol; Detailed Regulations, and Final Protocol
 1925 – Treaty concerning the Archipelago of Spitsbergen, and Protocol
 1925 – ILO Convention (No. 9) for Establishing Facilities for Finding Employment for Seamen
 1925 – Treaty relating to the Chinese Customs Tariff
 1925 – Treaty relating to the Principles and Policies to be followed in Matters concerning China
 1925 – International Convention relating to the Simplification of Customs Formalities, and Protocol of Signature
 1925 – International Agreement for the Creation at Paris of an International Office for Dealing with Contagious Diseases of Animals, and Annex
 1925 – International Convention for the Protection of Industrial Property, and Final Protocol
 1926 – Protocol of an Amendment to Article 4 of the Covenant of the League of Nations of 28 June 1919
 1926 – Protocol amending Article 5 of the International Convention relative to Air Navigation of 13 October 1919
 1926 – Protocol amending Article 34 of the International Convention relative to Air Navigation of 13 October 1919
 1926 – Convention on the International Régime of Maritime Ports, and Protocol of Signature
 1927 – Protocol amending Article 10 of the Convention for the Creation of an International Institute of Agriculture of 7 June 1905
 1927 – International Convention to Suppress the Slave Trade and Slavery
 1927 – Treaty between the Principal Allied Powers and Roumania respecting Bessarabia
 1928 – International Sanitary Convention, and Protocol of Signature
 1928 – Agreement respecting Facilities to be Given to Merchant Seamen for the Treatment of Venereal Disease
 1928 – International Convention relating to Dangerous Drugs, and Protocol
 1929 – General Treaty for Renunciation of War as an Instrument of National Policy (Kellogg-Briand Pact)
 1929 – International Radiotelegraph Convention; General Regulations; Additional Regulations
 1930 – Protocol for the Prohibition of the Use in War of Asphyxiating, Poisonous or other Gases, and of Bacteriological Methods of Warfare
 1930 – Universal Postal Convention, and Final Protocol; Detailed Regulations, and Final Protocol; Provisions regarding the Conveyance of Letter Mails by Air, and Final Protocol
 1930 – Agreement regarding the Complete and Final Settlement of the Question of Reparations from Germany, and Annexes I-XII
 1930 – Arrangement between the Creditor Powers of Germany concerning the Division of German Reparation Payments
 1930 – Agreement regarding the Final Discharge of the Financial Obligations of Austria
 1930 – International Agreement regarding the Financial Obligations of Czechoslovakia resulting from the Peace Treaties of 1919, etc.
 1930 – International Treaty for the Limitation and Reduction of Naval Armament
 1930 – Agreement in regard to the German Government International 51/2% Loan 1930
 1930 – Convention for the Unification of Certain Rules of Law with respect to Collisions between Vessels
 1930 – Convention for the Unification of Certain Rules of Law respecting Assistance and Salvage at Sea
 1930 – Optional Clause of the Statute of the Permanent Court of International Justice of 16 December 1920
 1931 – ILO Convention (No. 21) concerning the Simplification of the Inspection of Emigrants on Board Ship
 1931 – Geneva Convention for the Amelioration of the Condition of the Wounded and Sick in Armies in the Field
 1931 – Convention relative to the Treatment of Prisoners of War (Geneva, 27 July 1929)
 1931 – Agreement regarding the Settlement of Bulgarian Reparations pursuant to the Peace Treaty of 27 November 1919
 1931 – Agreements relating to the Obligations [of Hungary] resulting from the Treaty of Trianon of 4 June 1920; Letters and Declaration
 1931 – British Commonwealth Merchant Shipping Agreement
 1931 – Protocol concerning the Suspension of Payments by Germany
 1931 – Protocol concerning the Suspension of Payments by Czechoslovakia
 1932 – ILO Convention (No. 26) concerning the Creation of Minimum Wage-Fixing Machinery
 1932 – International Convention relating to Economic Statistics, and Protocol
 1932 – ILO Convention (No. 27) concerning the Marking of the Weight on Heavy Packages Transported by Vessels
 1932 – International Agreement between the Creditor Powers respecting State Properties ceded by Austria, Hungary and Bulgaria, the Liberation Debts and the Distribution of Non-German Reparations
 1932 – Protocol providing for the Suspension of Certain Payments by Bulgaria under the International Agreement of 20 January 1930
 1932 – Protocol providing for the Suspension of Certain Payments by Hungary under the International Agreements of 28 April 1930
 1932 – Supplementary Protocol to the Protocol concerning the Suspension of Payments by Germany of 11 August 1931
 1932 – Supplementary Protocol to the Protocol concerning the Suspension of Payments by Czechoslovakia of 11 August 1931
 1932 – Supplementary Protocol to the Protocol providing for the Suspension of Certain Payments by Bulgaria of 21 January 1932
 1932 – Supplementary Protocol to the Protocol providing for the Suspension of Certain Payments by Hungary of 21 January 1932
 1932 – Agreement concerning Non-German Reparations
 1932 – Agreement regarding Transitional Measures concerning German Reparations
 1933 – International Convention for the Protection of Industrial Property of 20 March 1883, revised at Brussels 14 December 1900, at Washington 2 June 1911, and at The Hague 6 November 1925
 1933 – Protocol concerning Amendments to Articles 3, 5, 7, 15, 34, 37, 41, 42 and to the Final Clauses of the International Convention relative to Air Navigation of 13 October 1919
 1933 – Protocol relating to Amendments to Articles 34 and 40 of the International Convention relative to Air Navigation of 13 October 1919
 1933 – Final Act of the Conference of Wheat Exporting and Importing Countries
 1933 – ILO Convention (No. 29) concerning Forced or Compulsory Labour
 1934 – Protocol of an Amendment to Article 393 [ILO Constitution] of the Treaty of Peace with Germany, done at Versailles on 28 June 1919, and the Corresponding Articles of the other Treaties of Peace
 1934 – Convention for Limiting the Manufacture and Regulating the Distribution of Narcotic Drugs, and Protocol of Signature
 1934 – International Telecommunication Convention
 1934 – Memorandum of Heads of Agreement concerning Silver
 1934 – International Agreement relating to Statistics of Causes of Death, and Protocol of Signature (London, 19 June 1934)
 1935 – ILO Convention (No. 7) fixing the Minimum Age for Admission of Children to Employment at Sea
 1935 – ILO Convention (No. 8) concerning Unemployment Indemnity in case of Loss or Foundering of the Ship
 1935 – ILO Convention (No. 15) fixing the Minimum Age for the Admission of Young Persons to Employment as Trimmers or Stokers
 1935 – ILO Convention (No. 16) concerning the Compulsory Medical Examination of Children and Young Persons Employed at Sea
 1935 – ILO Convention (No. 22) concerning Seamen's Articles of Agreement
 1935 – International Convention for the Suppression of the Circulation of and Traffic in Obscene Publications
 1935 – Berne Convention for the Protection of Literary and Artistic Works of 9 September 1886, as revised 13 November 1908 and 2 June 1928
 1935 – Agreement between the Governments of the United Kingdom of Great Britain and Northern Ireland, Australia, Canada, India, New Zealand and South Africa, and the German and French Governments, regarding War Graves
 1935 – International Sanitary Convention for Aerial Navigation
 1935 – Universal Postal Convention, Final Protocol and Detailed Regulations; Provisions relating to the Conveyance of Letter Mails by Air, and Final Protocol
 1935 – Agreement for Dispensing with Consular Visas on Bills of Health
 1935 – Agreement for Dispensing with Bills of Health
 1936 – International Convention for the Safety of Life at Sea
 1936 – Protocol concerning the Revision of the Statute of the Permanent Court of International Justice of 16 December 1920
 1936 – International Load Line Convention, and Final Protocol
 1936 – International Convention for the Suppression of the Traffic in Women of Full Age
 1936 – Convention regarding the Regime of the Straits, and Protocol (Montreux, 20 July 1936)
 1936 – Procès-Verbal relating to the Rules of Submarine Warfare set forth in Part IV of the Treaty for the Limitation and Reduction of Naval Armament of 22 April 1930
 1937 – Protocol relating to Military Obligations in Certain Cases of Double Nationality
 1937 – Protocol relating to a Certain Case of Statelessness
 1937 – Convention for Facilitating the International Circulation of Films of an Educational Character
 1937 – Treaty for the Limitation of Naval Armament, Protocol of Signature, and Additional Protocol
 1937 – International Agreement regarding the Regulation of Production and Marketing of Sugar, and Protocol
 1938 – Convention on Certain Questions relating to the Conflict of Nationality Laws
 1938 – Convention on the Stamp Laws in connection with Bills of Exchange and Promissory Notes, and Protocol
 1938 – Convention on the Stamp Laws in connection with Cheques, and Protocol
 1938 – Protocol regarding the Immunities of the Bank for International Settlements
 1938 – International Convention concerning the Use of Broadcasting in the Cause of Peace
 1938 – International Agreement modifying the Convention for the Creation of an International Institute of Refrigeration of 21 June 1920
 1938 – Convention regarding the Abolition of the Capitulations in Egypt, Protocol and Declaration by the Royal Egyptian Government
 1939 – Declaration regarding the Teaching of History (Revision of School Textbooks)
 1939 – Convention amending the International Sanitary Convention of 21 June 1926
 1939 – Additional Protocol to the Convention relating to the Salvage of Torpedoes of 12 June 1934
 1939 – Declaration by the Government of Australia concerning the Optional Clause of the Statute of the Permanent Court of International Justice of 16 December 1920
 1939 – Declaration by the Government of Australia concerning the General Act of Arbitration for the Pacific Settlement of International Disputes of 26 September 1928

1940–1949 multilateral treaties 
 1940 – ILO Convention (No. 63) concerning Statistics of Wages and Hours of Work in the Principal Mining and Manufacturing Industries, including Building and Construction, and in Agriculture
 1940 – Intergovernmental Agreement for Tasman Sea Air Services
 1940 – Protocol regarding Statistics of Causes of Death, revising the Annex to the International Agreement relating to Statistics of Death of 19 June 1934
 1940 – Process-Verbal concerning the Application of Articles IV, V, VI, VII, IX, XII and XIII of the Convention for Facilitating the International Circulation of Films of an Educational Character of 11 October 1933
 1940 – Exchange of Notes constituting an Agreement between His Majesty's Government in the Commonwealth of Australia and the Portuguese Government regarding the Establishment of an Air Service between Australia and Portuguese Timor
 1940 – Denunciation by the Government of Australia of Declaration of Acceptance of 20 September 1929 of the Optional Clause of the Statute of the Permanent Court of International Justice of 16 December 1920
 1942 – Declaration by United Nations; and Atlantic Charter of 14 August 1941
 1942 – Memorandum of Agreement between the United States of America, Argentina, Australia, Canada and the United Kingdom of Great Britain and Northern Ireland relating to the Production and Marketing of Wheat, and Draft Convention
 1942 – Protocol to enforce and to prolong the International Agreement regarding the Regulation of Production and Marketing of Sugar of 6 May 1937
 1943 – Declaration by United Nations on Forced Dispossession of Property in Enemy-Controlled Territory
 1943 – Agreement for United Nations Relief and Rehabilitation Administration [UNRRA]
 1944 – Protocol extending the Agreement regarding the Regulation of the Production and Marketing of Sugar of 6 May 1937
 1945 – Charter of the United Nations, as amended
 1945 – Interim Arrangements concluded by the Governments represented at the United Nations Conference on International Organization [establishing the Preparatory Commission of the United Nations]
 1945 – Agreement relating to Prisoners of War and Civilians Liberated by Forces operating under Soviet Command and Forces operating under British Command
 1945 – Agreement by the Government of the United Kingdom of Great Britain and Northern Ireland, the Government of the United States of America, the Provisional Government of the French Republic and the Government of the Union of Soviet Socialist Republics for the Prosecution and Punishment of the Major War Criminals of the European Axis [including the Charter of the International Military Tribunal -"Nuremberg Tribunal"]
 1945 – Protocol extending the Agreement regarding the Regulation of the Production and Marketing of Sugar of 6 May 1937
 1945 – Convention modifying the International Sanitary Convention of 21 June 1926
 1945 – Convention modifying the International Sanitary Convention for Aerial Navigation of 12 April 1933
 1945 – Constitution of the Food and Agriculture Organization of the United Nations
 1946 – Trusteeship Agreement for the Territory of New Guinea
 1946 – Protocol extending the Agreement regarding the Regulation of the Production and Marketing of Sugar of 6 May 1937
 1946 – Protocol to prolong the Convention of 15 December 1944 modifying the International Sanitary Convention of 21 June 1926
 1946 – Protocol to prolong the Convention of 15 December 1944 modifying the International Sanitary Convention for Aerial Navigation of 12 April 1933
 1946 – Agreement on Reparation from Germany, on the Establishment of an Inter-Allied Reparation Agency and on the Restitution of Monetary Gold
 1946 – Agreement between the Government of the Commonwealth of Australia and the Government of the United States of America on Settlement for Lend-Lease, Reciprocal Aid, Surplus War Property, and Claims
 1946 – Constitution of the United Nations Educational, Scientific and Cultural Organisation
 1946 – International Agreement for the Regulation of Whaling
 1946 – Protocol amending the International Agreement for the Regulation of Whaling of 8 June 1937
 1946 – Agreement between the Governments [British Commonwealth and United States of America] represented at the Bermuda Telecommunications Conference
 1946 – Exchange of Notes constituting an Agreement [between the Governments of Australia, Argentina, Canada, United Kingdom and United States of America] amending the Memorandum of Agreement relating to the Production and Marketing of Wheat of 22 April 1942
 1946 – Instrument for the Amendment of the Constitution of the International Labour Organization of 28 June 1919
 1947 – Agreement on Interim Measures to be taken in respect of Refugees and Displaced Persons
 1947 – Agreement between the Government of Australia and the Preparatory Commission of the International Refugee Organization regarding the Migration to Australia of Refugees and Displaced Persons
 1947 – Agreement between the Governments of Australia, New Zealand and the United Kingdom for the Formation of British Commonwealth Pacific Airlines Limited
 1947 – Protocol extending the Agreement regarding the Regulation of the Production and Marketing of Sugar of 6 May 1937
 1947 – Protocol concerning the Office International d'Hygiene Publique [International Office of Public Health]
 1947 – Trusteeship Agreement for the Territory of Nauru
 1947 – Protocol amending the International Agreement for the Regulation of Whaling of 8 June 1937 and the Protocol for the Regulation of Whaling of 24 June 1938
 1947 – Agreement for the Establishment of a Provisional Maritime Consultative Council
 1947 – Articles of Agreement of the International Monetary Fund
 1947 – Articles of Agreement of the International Bank for Reconstruction and Development, as amended 25 August 1965 (Article III) and 30 June 1987 (Article VIII(a))
 1947 – Protocol to amend the Convention for the Suppression of the Circulation of and Traffic in Obscene Publications of 12 September 1923
 1947 – Protocol to amend the Convention for the Suppression of the Traffic in Women and Children of 30 September 1921, and the Convention for the Suppression of the Traffic in Women of Full Age of 11 October 1933
 1947 – Protocol amending the Agreements, Conventions and Protocols on Narcotic Drugs of 23 January 1912, 11 February 1925, 19 February 1925, 13 July 1931, 27 November 1931 and 26 June 1936
 1947 – International Convention modifying the Convention respecting the Creation of an International Office of Weights and Measures of 20 May 1875 [Metric Convention, and amendments]
 1947 – Amendment to Article IV, paragraph 10, of the Constitution of the United Nations Educational, Scientific and Cultural Organization of 16 November 1945 (Mexico City, 1 December 1947)
 1948 – Treaty of Peace with Bulgaria; Treaty of Peace with Finland; Treaty of Peace with Hungary; Treaty of Peace with Italy; Treaty of Peace with Roumania
 1948 – Agreement between the Government of Australia and the United Nations International Children's Emergency Fund
 1948 – Protocol for the Dissolution of the International Institute of Agriculture and the Transfer of its Functions and Assets to the Food and Agriculture Organization of the United Nations
 1948 – Protocol for the Regulation of Whaling for the 1947–48 Season
 1948 – Arrangement establishing the Interim Commission of the World Health Organization
 1948 – Constitution of the World Health Organization
 1948 – Instrument for the Amendment of the Constitution of the International Labour Organization of 28 June 1919, as amended
 1948 – Agreement establishing the South Pacific Commission
 1948 – Constitution of the International Refugee Organization
 1948 – International Convention for the Regulation of Whaling [International Whaling Convention]
 1948 – Agreement respecting certain SS Maréchal Joffre Claims
 1948 – Protocol extending the Agreement regarding the Regulation of Production and Marketing of Sugar of 6 May 1937
 1948 – Protocol amending the International Convention relating to Economic Statistics of 14 December 1928
 1948 – General Agreement on Tariff and Trade [GATT]
 1948 – Additional Protocol to the Agreement on Reparation from Germany, on the Establishment of an Allied Reparation Agency, and on the Restitution of Monetary Gold of 14 January 1946
 1948 – Amendments to Article IV of the Constitution of the United Nations Educational, Scientific and Cultural Organization of 16 November 1945 (Beirut, 10 December 1948)
 1949 – International Telecommunication Union, Final Protocol, and Additional Protocols I-X
 1949 – Convention on the Privileges and Immunities of the United Nations
 1949 – Agreement for the Establishment of the Indo-Pacific Fisheries Council
 1949 – ILO Convention (No. 80) for the Partial Revision of Conventions adopted at the first Twenty-Eight Sessions of the General Conference of the International Labour Organization (Final Articles Revision Convention)
 1949 – International Wheat Agreement
 1949 – Universal Postal Convention and Final Protocol; Detailed Regulations; Provisions regarding Conveyance of Letter Mails by Air, and Final Protocol
 1949 – Inter-Governmental Agreement between Australia, New Zealand and the United Kingdom of Great Britain and Northern Ireland for the Continued Operation and Development of Pacific Air Services by British Commonwealth Pacific Airlines Limited (Canberra, 27 October 1949)
 1949 – Inter-Governmental Agreement between Australia, New Zealand and the United Kingdom of Great Britain and Northern Ireland for the Continued Operation of the Regular Services between Australia and New Zealand by Tasman Empire Airways Limited (Wellington, 15 September 1949)
 1949 – Protocol for the prolongation of the Agreement regarding the Regulation of the Production and Marketing of Sugar of 6 May 1937
 1949 – Protocol bringing under International Control Drugs outside the Scope of the Convention for Limiting the Manufacture and Regulating the Distribution of Narcotic Drugs of 13 July 1931, as amended
 1949 – Protocol amending the International Agreement for the Suppression of the White Slave Traffic of 18 May 1904 and the International Convention for the Suppression of the White Slave Traffic of 4 May 1910
 1949 – Protocol amending the Agreement for the Suppression of the Circulation of Obscene Publications of 4 May 1910
 1949 – Agreement to revise the British Commonwealth-United States Telecommunications Agreement of 4 December 1945
 1949 – Amendment to Article IV of the Constitution of the United Nations Educational, Scientific and Cultural Organization of 16 November 1945 (Paris, 5 October 1949)
 1949 – Amendments to paragraphs 6, 7(a) and 10 of the Schedule to the International Convention for the Regulation of Whaling of 2 December 1946 (London, 7 June 1949)

1950–1959 multilateral treaties 
 1950 – Convention of the World Meteorological Organization, and Protocol concerning Spain
 1950 – Agreement between the Governments of the United Kingdom, Australia, India, Pakistan and Ceylon on the one hand and the Government of Burma on the other hand respecting a Loan of [sterling]6,000,000 to be made by the Five Commonwealth Governments to the Government of Burma
 1950 – Loan Agreement between the Commonwealth of Australia and the International Bank for Reconstruction and Development
 1950 – ILO Convention (No. 88) concerning the Organisation of the Employment Service
 1950 – Protocol amending the Convention concerning the Creation of an International Union for the Publication of Customs Tariffs, the Regulations for the Execution of the Convention instituting an International Bureau for the Publication of Customs Tariffs, and the Memorandum of Signature, of 5 July 1890
 1950 – World Health Organization Regulations No. 1 regarding Nomenclature (including the Compilation and Publication of Statistics) with respect to Diseases and Causes of Death
 1950 – Amendment to Article V, paragraph 3, of the Constitution of the United Nations Educational, Scientific and Cultural Organization of 16 November 1945 (Florence, 15 June 1950)
 1950 – Amendment to paragraph 17 of the Schedule to the International Convention for the Regulation of Whaling of 2 December 1946 (London, 7 June 1949)
 1951 – Convention on the Prevention and Punishment of the Crime of Genocide
 1951 – Agreement between the Governments of the United Kingdom of Great Britain and Northern Ireland, Canada, Australia, New Zealand, the Union of South Africa, India and Pakistan and the Government of the Kingdom of the Netherlands relative to the Graves of Members of the Armed Forces of the British Commonwealth in Netherlands Territories
 1951 – Agreement between the Governments of the United Kingdom of Great Britain and Northern Ireland, Australia, Canada, India, New Zealand, Pakistan and the Union of South Africa and the Government of Belgium respecting the War Cemeteries, Graves and Memorials of the British Commonwealth in Belgian Territory
 1951 – Agreement extending the Territorial Scope of the South Pacific Commission
 1951 – Agreement between the Governments of the United Kingdom of Great Britain and Northern Ireland, Canada, Australia, New Zealand, the Union of South Africa, India and Pakistan, and the Government of the French Republic regarding British Commonwealth War Graves in French Territory
 1951 – Amendments to Articles II and IV of the Constitution of the United Nations Educational, Scientific and Cultural Organization of 16 November 1945 (Paris, 11 July 1951)
 1951 – Amendments to the Schedule to the International Convention for the Regulation of Whaling of 2 December 1946 (Cape Town, 27 July 1951)
 1952 – Treaty of Peace with Japan, and Protocol
 1952 – Security Treaty between Australia, New Zealand and the United States of America [ANZUS]
 1952 – International Plant Protection Convention
 1952 – Agreement between the Government of the Commonwealth of Australia and the Food and Agriculture Organization of the United Nations for the Provision of Technical Assistance to the Governments of Tropical and Semi-Tropical Regions in the Form of a Eucalyptus Study Tour
 1952 – International Plant Protection Convention
 1952 – Agreement for the Settlement of Disputes arising under Article 15(a) of the Treaty of Peace with Japan of 8 September 1951
 1952 – Loan Agreement between the Commonwealth of Australia and the International Bank for Reconstruction and Development
 1952 – Supplementary Agreement to revise Article II of the British Commonwealth-United States of America Telecommunications Agreement of 12 August 1949
 1952 – Exchange of Notes constituting an Agreement between the Government of Australia and the United Nations Technical Assistance Board regarding the Procurement and Delivery of Supplies by Australia to the Board
 1952 – Protocol for the Prolongation of the Agreement regarding the Regulation of Production and Marketing of Sugar of 6 May 1937
 1952 – Amendment to Article VI(2) of the Agreement for the Establishment of the Indo-Pacific Fisheries Council of 26 February 1948 (Quezon City, 7 November 1952)
 1952 – Amendments to Articles IV, V and VI of the Constitution of the United Nations Educational, Scientific and Cultural Organization of 16 November 1945 (necessitated by the adoption of the system of biennial sessions of the General Conference) (Paris, 5 December 1952)
 1952 – Amendments to paragraphs 6, 8(c) and 8(e) of the Schedule to the International Convention for the Regulation of Whaling of 2 December 1946 (London, 6 June 1952)
 1953 – Protocol for the Termination of the Agreement for the Unification of Pharmacopoeial Formulas for Potent Drugs of 29 November 1906, as revised 20 August 1929
 1953 – Constitution of the International Rice Commission, as amended May 1952
 1953 – Agreement revising and renewing the International Wheat Agreement of 23 March 1949
 1953 – Protocol between Australia, Canada, New Zealand, United Kingdom of Great Britain and Northern Ireland and United States of America, and Japan, on the Exercise of Criminal Jurisdiction over the United Nations Forces in Japan, and Agreed Official Minutes regarding Article concerning Criminal Jurisdiction
 1953 – Protocol amending the convention to Suppress the Slave Trade and Slavery of 25 September 1926
 1953 – International Sugar Agreement
 1953 – Amendments to the Schedule to the International Convention for the Regulation of Whaling of 2 December 1946 (London, 26 June 1953)
 1954 – Agreement between the Governments of the United Kingdom of Great Britain and Northern Ireland, Australia, Canada, India, New Zealand, Pakistan and the Union of South Africa and the Government of the Kingdom of Denmark regarding the War Graves and Memorials of the British Commonwealth in Danish Territory
 1954 – Convention relating to the Status of Refugees
 1954 – Instrument for the Amendment of the Constitution of the International Labour Organization
 1954 – Declaration by Australia recognizing as Compulsory the Jurisdiction of the International Court of Justice
 1954 – Agreement regarding the Status of the United Nations Forces in Japan, and Agreed Official Minutes
 1954 – Loan Agreement between the Commonwealth of Australia and the International Bank for Reconstruction and Development
 1954 – ILO Convention (No. 45) concerning the Employment of Women on Underground Work in Mines of all Kinds
 1954 – Universal Postal Union: Universal Postal Convention, and Final Protocol; Detailed Regulations; Provisions regarding Air Mail Correspondence, and Final Protocol
 1954 – Special Protocol relating to Article XXIV of the General Agreement on Tariffs and Trade [GATT] of 30 October 1947
 1954 – Agreement on German External Debts
 1954 – Agreement relating to the Frequency of Sessions of the South Pacific Commission
 1954 – Constitution of the Intergovernmental Committee for European Migration
 1954 – International Telecommunication Convention, Final Protocol, and Additional Protocols I-IV
 1954 – Exchange of Notes constituting an Agreement between the Governments of Australia, New Zealand and the United Kingdom of Great Britain and Northern Ireland, and the Government of the Republic of Korea, for Settlement of Advances in Korean Currency made to the British Commonwealth Forces, Korea
 1954 – Amendments to Article V of the Constitution of the United Nations Educational, Scientific and Cultural Organization of 16 November 1945 (concerning the composition of the executive board) (Montevideo, 22 November 1954)
 1954 – Amendments to Article II (concerning withdrawal of Member States) and Articles V and VI (concerning reports by the Director-General on the activities of the Organization) of the Constitution of the United Nations Educational, Scientific and Cultural Organization of 16 November 1945 (Montevideo, 8 December 1954)
 1954 – Amendments to the Schedule to the International Convention for the Regulation of Whaling of 2 December 1946 (Tokyo, 23 July 1954)
 1955 – Convention on Road Traffic
 1955 – Southeast Asia Collective Defense Treaty [SEATO], and Protocol
 1955 – ILO Convention (No. 85) concerning Labour Inspectorates in Non-Metropolitan Territories
 1955 – Agreement between the Governments of the United Kingdom of Great Britain and Northern Ireland, Canada, Australia, New Zealand, the Union of South Africa, India and Pakistan and the Government of Italy relative to the Graves in Italian Territory of Members of the Armed Forces of the British Commonwealth, Protocol of Signature, and Exchange of Notes
 1955 – Agreement between the Governments of the United Kingdom of Great Britain and Northern Ireland, Canada, Australia, New Zealand, the Union of South Africa, India and Pakistan and the Egyptian Government regarding War Cemeteries, Graves and Memorials of the British Commonwealth in Egypt resulting from the War of 1939 [modifying the Agreement of 2 June 1937]
 1955 – Loan Agreement between the Commonwealth of Australia and the International Bank for Reconstruction and Development
 1955 – Agreement between the Governments of the United Kingdom of Great Britain and Northern Ireland, Canada, Australia, New Zealand, the Union of South Africa, India and Pakistan and the Government of Iraq regarding War Cemeteries Graves and Memorials of the British Commonwealth in Iraq resulting from the War of 1939–1945
 1955 – Agreement between the Governments of the United Kingdom of Great Britain and Northern Ireland, Australia and India and the Government of Thailand regarding War Graves, and Exchange of Notes
 1955 – Declaration on the Continued Application of Schedules to the General Agreement on Tariffs and Trade of 30 October 1947
 1955 – Amendments to the Constitution of the International Rice Commission of 13 March 1948 (18 November 1955)
 1955 – Amendments to Articles II of the Agreement for the Establishment of the Indo-Pacific Fisheries Council of 26 February 1948 (Tokyo, 14 October 1955)
 1955 – Amendments to the Schedule to the International Convention for the Regulation of Whaling of 2 December 1946 (Moscow, 23 July 1955)
 1956 – International Convention for the Unification of Certain Rules of Law relating to Bills of Lading [Hague Rules], and Protocol of Signature
 1956 – Agreement concerning the International Institute of Refrigeration
 1956 – International Convention to Facilitate the Importation of Commercial Samples and Advertising Material
 1956 – Agreement between the United Kingdom of Great Britain and Northern Ireland, Canada, Australia, New Zealand, the Union of South Africa, India and Pakistan, and Japan, relative to the British Commonwealth War Cemetery in Japan
 1956 – Plant Protection Agreement for the South East Asia and Pacific Region
 1956 – Exchange of Notes constituting an Agreement terminating the Inter-Governmental Agreement for the Continued Operation of the Regular Services between Australia and New Zealand by Tasman Empire Airways Limited of 15 September 1949
 1956 – Articles of Agreement of the International Finance Corporation
 1956 – (First) International Tin Agreement
 1956 – International Wheat Agreement, 1956
 1956 – Sixth Protocol of Supplementary Concessions to the General Agreement on Tariffs and Trade of 30 October 1947
 1956 – Amendments to Article V of the Constitution of the United Nations Educational, Scientific and Cultural Organization of 16 November 1945 (composition of the executive board) (New Delhi, 10 November 1956)
 1956 – Amendments to the Schedule to the International Convention for the Regulation of Whaling of 2 December 1946 (London, 20 July 1956)
 1957 – Interim Agreement on International Civil Aviation
 1957 – Protocol amending the International Sugar Agreement of 1 October 1953
 1957 – Agreement between the Government of Australia and the Food and Agriculture Organization of the United Nations for the Provision of Technical Assistance to the Government of Australia and other Countries and Territories of the Indo-Pacific Region in the Form of a Training Center in Fishery Cooperatives and Administration
 1957 – Statute of the International Atomic Energy Agency [IAEA] (New York, 26 October 1956)
 1957 – Agreement between the Government of the Commonwealth of Australia and the Government of the United States of America for Cooperation regarding Atomic Information for Mutual Defense Purposes
 1957 – ILO Convention (No. 10) concerning the Age for Admission of Children to Employment in Agriculture, as modified 9 October 1946
 1957 – ILO Convention (No. 11) concerning the Rights of Association and Combination of Agricultural Workers, as modified 9 October 1946
 1957 – Procès-Verbal of Rectification concerning the Protocol amending Part I and Articles XXIX and XXX of the General Agreement on Tariffs and Trade of 10 March 1955, the Protocol amending the Preamble and Parts II and III of the General Agreement on Tariffs and Trade of 10 March 1955 and the Protocol of Organizational Amendments to the General Agreement on Tariffs and Trade of 10 March 1955
 1957 – Protocol amending the Preamble and Parts II and III of the General Agreement on Tariffs and Trade of 30 October 1947
 1957 – Commonwealth Telegraphs Agreement, and Protocol
 1957 – Amendments to the Schedule to the International Convention for the Regulation of Whaling of 2 December 1946 (London, 28 June 1957)
 1958 – Agreement between the Government of Australia and the Government of the United States of America to Facilitate Interchange of Patent Rights and Technical Information for Defence Purposes, and Exchange of Notes
 1958 – Convention on the Intergovernmental Maritime Consultative Organization
 1958 – European Convention on the International Classification of Patents for Invention
 1958 – International Convention for the Protection of Industrial Property of 20 March 1883, as revised 14 December 1900, 2 June 1911, 6 November 1925 and 2 June 1934
 1958 – Loan Agreement (Qantas Project) between the Commonwealth of Australia and the International Bank for Reconstruction and Development
 1958 – Loan Agreement between the Commonwealth of Australia and the International Bank for Reconstruction and Development
 1958 – Protocol amending Article 45 of the Convention on International Civil Aviation of 7 December 1944
 1958 – Agreement between the United Kingdom of Great Britain and Northern Ireland, Canada, Australia, New Zealand, the Union of South Africa, India and Pakistan, the Federal Republic of Germany and the French Republic in regard to War Cemeteries, Graves and Memorials of the British Commonwealth
 1958 – Agreement between the United Kingdom of Great Britain and Northern Ireland, Canada, Australia, New Zealand, the Union of South Africa, India and Pakistan and the Federal Republic of Germany regarding the War Graves, Cemeteries and Memorials of the British Commonwealth in the Territory of the Federal Republic of Germany, and Exchange of Notes
 1958 – Geneva Conventions for the Amelioration of the Condition of the Wounded and Sick in Armed Forces in the Field
 1958 – Amendment to Article IV of the International Tin Agreement of 1 March 1954
 1958 – World Health Organization Additional Regulations amending the Regulations No. 1 regarding Nomenclature (including Compilation and Publication of Statistics) with respect to Diseases and Causes of Death of 24 July 1948, as amended
 1958 – Amendments to Articles II, III and VI of the Agreement for the Establishment of the Indo-Pacific Fisheries Council of 26 February 1948 (Colombo, 17 December 1958)
 1958 – Amendment to Article IV of the Constitution of the United Nations Educational, Scientific and Cultural Organization of 16 November 1945 (two-thirds majority) (Paris, 3 December 1958)
 1958 – Amendments to the Schedule to the International Convention for the Regulation of Whaling of 2 December 1946 (The Hague, 27 June 1958)
 1959 – International Sugar Agreement of 1958
 1959 – Agreement on North Atlantic Ocean Stations
 1959 – ILO Convention (No. 18) concerning Workmen's Compensation for Occupational Diseases
 1959 – ILO Convention (No. 42) concerning Workmen's Compensation for Occupational Diseases (Revised)
 1959 – ILO Convention (No. 19) concerning Equality of Treatment for National and Foreign Workers as regards Workmen's Compensation for Accidents
 1959 – Protocol to the International Convention for the Regulation of Whaling of 2 December 1946
 1959 – Convention establishing an International Organization of Legal Metrology
 1959 – Utilities Claims Settlement Agreement between the United States of America (as Unified Command and on its Own Behalf and on Behalf of the States furnishing Military Forces or Field Hospitals to the Unified Command [including Australia]) and the Republic of Korea
 1959 – International Wheat Agreement, 1959
 1959 – Fourth Protocol of Rectifications and Modifications to the Annexes and to the Texts of the Schedules to the General Agreement on Tariffs and Trade of 30 October 1947
 1959 – Amendments to Article 13 of the Convention of the World Meteorological Organization of 11 October 1947 (Geneva, 15 April 1959)
 1959 – Amendments to Articles V, XVIII and XX of the Constitution of the Food and Agriculture Organization of the United Nations of 16 October 1945 (Rome, November 1959)
 1959 – Amendments to the Schedule to the International Convention for the Regulation of Whaling of 2 December 1946 (London, 1 July 1959)

1960–1969 multilateral treaties 
 1960 – International Convention for the Safety of Life at Sea, 1948
 1960 – ILO Convention (No. 12) concerning Workmen's Compensation in Agriculture
 1960 – ILO Convention (No. 105) concerning the Abolition of Forced Labour
 1960 – Articles of Agreement of the International Development Association
 1960 – Agreement between the Governments of Cambodia, Laos, Thailand and Vietnam and the Government of Australia concerning Tax Exemption of Australian Contribution for the Development of the Water Resources of the Lower Mekong Basin
 1960 – Declaration on Relations between Contracting Parties to the General Agreement on Tariffs and Trade of 30 October 1947 and the Government of the Polish People's Republic
 1960 – Amendments to Articles 24 and 25 of the Constitution of the World Health Organization of 22 July 1946
 1960 – Declaration on Relations between Contracting Parties to the General Agreement on Tariffs and Trade of 30 October 1947 and the Government of the Federal People's Republic of Yugoslavia
 1960 – Declaration on Relations between Contracting Parties to the General Agreement on Tariffs and Trade of 30 October 1947 and the Government of the Federal People's Republic of Yugoslavia
 1961 – Convention establishing a Customs Co-operation Council [CCC]
 1961 – Indus Basin Development Fund Agreement, 1960
 1961 – Convention on the Nationality of Married Women
 1961 – Convention on the Taxation of Road Vehicles for Private Use in International Traffic, and Protocol of Signature
 1961 – Agreement of Nice concerning the International Classification of Goods and Services to which Trade Marks are Applied
 1961 – The Antarctic Treaty
 1961 – State Treaty for the Re-Establishment of an Independent and Democratic Austria
 1961 – Second International Tin Agreement
 1961 – Constitution of the Eastern Regional Organization for Public Administration (EROPA), as amended 9 December 1960
 1961 – Declaration on the Provisional Accession of Israel to the General Agreement on Tariffs and Trade of 30 October 1947
 1961 – Amendment to [Article III of] the Articles of Agreement of the International Finance Corporation [IFC] of 25 May 1955 (1 September 1961)
 1961 – Amendments to the Constitution of the International Rice Commission of 13 March 1948 (23 November 1961)
 1961 – Amendments to the Agreement for the Establishment of the Indo-Pacific Fisheries Council of 26 February 1948 (23 November 1961)
 1961 – Amendments to Articles III and V of the Constitution of the Food and Agriculture Organization of the United Nations of 16 October 1945 (Rome, 13 November 1961)
 1961 – Amendments to the Schedule to the International Convention for the Regulation of Whaling of 2 December 1946 (London, 24 June 1960)
 1962 – International Telecommunication Convention, Final Protocol and Additional Protocols I-IV
 1962 – Protocol amending Article 50(a) of the Convention on International Civil Aviation of 7 December 1944
 1962 – International Convention for the Prevention of Pollution of the Sea by Oil, 1954
 1962 – International Wheat Agreement, 1962
 1962 – Convention on the Privileges and Immunities of the Specialized Agencies
 1962 – Protocol establishing a Preparatory Group with a View to the Creation of a European Organisation for the Development and Construction of Space Vehicle Launchers, and Supplementary Agreement
 1962 – Short-Term Arrangements regarding International Trade in Cotton Textiles
 1962 – Declaration on the Provisional Accession of Tunisia to the General Agreement on Tariffs and Trade of 30 October 1947
 1962 – Declaration on the Provisional Accession of Argentina to the General Agreement on Tariffs and Trade of 30 October 1947
 1962 – Loan Agreement (Snowy Mountains Project) between the Commonwealth of Australia and the International Bank for Reconstruction and Development
 1962 – Amendment to Article V of the Constitution of the United Nations Educational, Scientific and Cultural Organization of 16 November 1945 (increase in the number of members of the executive board) (Paris, 15 November 1962)
 1962 – Amendment to the Schedule to the International Convention for the Regulation of Whaling of 2 December 1946 (London, 6 July 1962)
 1963 – Customs Convention concerning Facilities for the Importation of Goods for Display or Use at Exhibitions, Fairs, Meetings or Similar Events
 1963 – Protocol for Limiting and Regulating the Cultivation of the Poppy Plant, the Production of, International and Wholesale Trade in, and Use of Opium
 1963 – Convention on the Territorial Sea and the Contiguous Zone
 1963 – Instrument for the Amendment of the Constitution of the International Labour Organization of 28 June 1919, as amended
 1963 – Amendment to Article VI.A.3 of the Statute of the International Atomic Energy Agency of 26 October 1956
 1963 – Protocol amending the International Convention for the Unification of Certain Rules relating to International Carriage by Air [Warsaw Convention] of 12 October 1929 (include full text of Warsaw Convention)
 1963 – Commonwealth Telegraphs Agreement, 1963
 1963 – ILO Convention (No. 116) concerning the Partial Revision of the Conventions adopted by the General Conference of the International Labour Organization at its First Thirty-Two Sessions for the purpose of Standardising the Provisions regarding the preparation of Reports by the Governing Body of the International Labour Office on the Working of Conventions [Final Articles Revision Convention]
 1963 – Treaty banning Nuclear Weapon Tests in the Atmosphere, in Outer Space and Under Water
 1963 – [First] International Coffee Agreement, 1962
 1963 – [First] Procès-Verbal extending the Declaration on the Provisional Accession of Argentina to the General Agreement on Tariffs and Trade of 18 November 1960
 1963 – Agreement between the Government of Australia and the United Nations relating to a Seminar on the Role of the Police in the Protection of Human Rights
 1963 – Exchange of Notes constituting an Agreement between the Government of the United Kingdom of Great Britain and Northern Ireland [and on behalf of the Governments of Australia, Canada, India, New Zealand, Pakistan and South Africa] and the Government of the Italian Republic exempting from Italian Dues and Taxes, Fuels and Lubricants used by the Commonwealth War Graves Commission acting under the War Graves Agreement of 27 August 1953
 1963 – Amendments to Article 13 of the Convention of the World Meteorological Organization of 11 October 1947 (Geneva, 11 April 1963)
 1963 – Amendments to Articles VI and X of the Constitution of the Food and Agriculture Organization of the United Nations of 16 October 1945 (Rome, 3 December 1963)
 1963 – Amendments to the Schedule to the International Convention for the Regulation of Whaling of 2 December 1946 (London, 5 July 1963)
 1964 – Convention Supplementary to the International Convention for the Unification of Certain Rules relating to International Carriage by Air of 12 October 1929
 1964 – Protocol for the Prolongation of the International Sugar Agreement of 1 December 1958
 1964 – Convention for the Establishment of a European Organisation for the Development and Construction of Space Vehicle Launchers, Financial Protocol, and Protocol concerning Certain Responsibilities in connection with the Initial Programme
 1964 – Agreement between the Governments of Australia, Canada, India, New Zealand, Pakistan and the United Kingdom of Great Britain and Northern Ireland, and the Government of the Republic of Indonesia, respecting the War Cemeteries, Graves and Memorials of the Commonwealth in Indonesian Territory
 1964 – Interim Agreement between the Government of Australia, the Government of the United Kingdom of Great Britain and Northern Ireland and the European Organisation for the Development and Construction of Space Vehicle Launchers [ELDO] for the Conduct of the Phase I Firings of the Initial Programme of the Organisation
 1964 – Indus Basin Development Fund (Supplemental) Agreement, 1964
 1964 – Agreement establishing Interim Arrangements for a Global Commercial Communications Satellite System
 1964 – Agreement between the Government of Australia and the United Nations Special Fund concerning Assistance from the Special Fund for a Project of Research on the Control of the Coconut Rhinoceros Beetle
 1964 – Second Procès-Verbal extending the Declaration on the Provisional Accession of Tunisia to the General Agreement on Tariffs and Trade of 12 November 1959
 1964 – Declaration on the Provisional Accession of the United Arab Republic to the General Agreement on Tariffs and Trade of 30 October 1947
 1964 – Exchange of Notes constituting an Agreement between the Government of Australia [and on behalf of the Governments of New Zealand and the United Kingdom of Great Britain and Northern Ireland] and the Government of the United States of America relating to the Settlement for Logistical Support provided by the United States of America to Certain Armed Forces for United Nations Operations in Korea
 1964 – Amendments to the Schedule to the International Convention for the Regulation of Whaling of 2 December 1946 (Sandefjord, 26 June 1964)
 1965 – Agreement amending the Agreement establishing the South Pacific Commission of 6 February 1947
 1965 – Protocol for the Extension of the International Wheat Agreement of 10 March 1962
 1965 – Supplementary Agreement to the Interim Agreement between Australia, the United Kingdom of Great Britain and Northern Ireland and the European Organisation for the Development and Construction of Space Vehicle Launchers [ELDO] for the Conduct of the Phase I Firings of the Initial Programme of the Organisation of 6 May 1964
 1965 – Agreement between Australia and the European Organisation for the Construction and Development of Space Vehicle Launchers [ELDO] governing the Conduct in Australia and Territories under the Authority of Australia of the Operations of the Organisation, and Two Exchanges of Notes
 1965 – Agreement between the Government of the Commonwealth of Australia, the Government of New Zealand and the Government of the United Kingdom of Great Britain and Northern Ireland relating to the Territory of Nauru
 1965 – Second Procès-Verbal extending the Declaration on the Provisional Accession of Argentina to the General Agreement on Tariffs and Trade of 18 November 1960
 1965 – GATT: UAR extension – Second Procès-Verbal extending the Declaration on the Provisional Accession of Argentina to the General Agreement on Tariffs and Trade of 18 November 1960
 1965 – Amendments to [Articles III and IV of] the Articles of Agreement of the International Finance Corporation [IFC] of 25 May 1955 (25 August 1965)
 1965 – Amendments to Preamble and Article V of the Constitution of the Food and Agriculture Organization of the United Nations of 16 October 1945 (Rome, 1 December 1965)
 1965 – Amendments to the Schedule to the International Convention for the Regulation of Whaling of 2 December 1946 (London, 2 July 1965)
 1966 – Protocol for the Further Prolongation of the International Sugar Agreement of 1 December 1958
 1966 – Exchanges of Notes constituting an Agreement between the Government of Australia and the United Nations concerning the Service with the United Nations Force in Cyprus [UNFICYP] of the National Contingent provided by Australia
 1966 – Third International Tin Agreement
 1966 – Agreement establishing the Asian Development Bank
 1966 – Protocol for the Further Extension of the International Wheat Agreement of 10 March 1962
 1966 – Universal Postal Union: Constitution, and Final Protocol; General Regulations, and Final Protocol; Convention, and Final Protocol; Detailed Regulations; Agreement concerning Postal Parcels, and Final Protocol; Detailed Regulations, and Final Protocol
 1966 – Nam Ngum Development Fund Agreement, 1966
 1966 – Agreement between the Government of the Commonwealth of Australia, the Government of the United States of America and the International Atomic Energy Agency for the Application of Safeguards
 1966 – Protocol for the Further Prolongation of the International Sugar Agreement of 1 December 1958
 1966 – Convention against Discrimination in Education
 1966 – Supplementary Agreement on Arbitration to the Special Agreement of 20 August 1964 related to the Agreement establishing Interim Arrangements for a Global Commercial Communications Satellite System of 20 August 1964
 1966 – Protocol amending the General Agreement on Tariffs and Trade of 30 October 1947 to Introduce a Part IV on Trade and Development
 1966 – Amendments to the Schedule to the International Convention for the Regulation of Whaling of 2 December 1946 (London, 1 July 1966)
 1967 – Convention concerning Customs Facilities for Touring, as amended 6 September 1966
 1967 – Customs Convention on the Temporary Importation of Private Road Vehicles
 1967 – Customs Convention on Containers, and Protocol of Signature
 1967 – Customs Convention concerning Welfare Material for Seafarers
 1967 – International Regulations for Preventing Collisions at Sea
 1967 – International Telecommunication Convention; Final Protocol; Additional Protocols I-IV and Optional Additional Protocol
 1967 – Agreement between the Government of Australia and the United Nations Development Programme concerning Assistance from the Special Fund Sector of the United Nations Development Programme for the Territory of Papua and the Trust Territory of New Guinea
 1967 – Memorandum of Agreement on Basic Elements for the Negotiation of a World Grains Arrangement
 1967 – Amendments to the International Convention for the Prevention of Pollution of the Sea by Oil of 12 May 1954
 1967 – Protocol for the Further Extension of the International Wheat Agreement of 10 March 1962
 1967 – Customs Convention on the A.T.A. Carnet for the Temporary Admission of Goods
 1967 – Protocol extending the Long-Term Arrangement regarding International Trade in Cotton Textiles of 9 February 1962
 1967 – Treaty on Principles Governing the Activities of States in the Exploration and Use of Outer Space, including the Moon and other Celestial Bodies
 1967 – Agreement between the Governments of the United Kingdom of Great Britain and Northern Ireland, Canada, Australia, New Zealand, India and Pakistan, and the Imperial Ethiopian Government respecting the War Cemeteries, Graves and Memorials of the British Commonwealth in Ethiopian Territory
 1967 – Protocol on Privileges and Immunities of the European Launcher Development Organisation, and Protocol of Signature
 1967 – Agreement between the Government of Australia and the United Nations Children's Fund concerning Cooperation in relation to Projects to be carried out in the Territory of Papua and the Trust Territory of New Guinea
 1967 – Single Convention on Narcotic Drugs, 1961
 1967 – Third Procès-Verbal extending the Declaration on the Provisional Accession of Argentina to the General Agreement on Tariffs and Trade of 18 November 1960
 1967 – Second Procès-Verbal extending the Declaration on the Provisional Accession of the United Arab Republic to the General Agreement on Tariffs and Trade of 13 November 1962
 1967 – Second Procès-Verbal extending the Declaration on the Provisional Accession of the United Arab Republic to the General Agreement on Tariffs and Trade of 13 November 1962
 1967 – Amendments to Articles 4(b) and 12(c) of the Convention of the World Meteorological Organization of 11 October 1947 (Geneva, 11 April 1967)
 1967 – Amendments to Article V of the Constitution of the Food and Agriculture Organization of the United Nations of 16 October 1945 (Rome, November 1967)
 1967 – Amendments to the Schedule to the International Convention for the Regulation of Whaling of 2 December 1946 (London, 30 June 1967)
 1968 – Geneva (1967) Protocol to the General Agreement on Tariffs and Trade of 30 October 1947 [Kennedy Round]
 1968 – World Health Organization Nomenclature Regulations (including the Compilation and Publication of Statistics) with respect to Diseases and Causes of Death, 1967
 1968 – Vienna Convention on Diplomatic Relations
 1968 – Optional Protocol to the Convention on Diplomatic Relations of 18 April 1961 concerning the Compulsory Settlement of Disputes
 1968 – Customs Convention on the Temporary Importation of Professional Equipment
 1968 – International Convention for the Safety of Life at Sea, 1960, and Regulations
 1968 – Agreement between the Government of Australia and the Organizations participating in the Technical Assistance Sector of the United Nations Development Programme (United Nations; International Labour Organization; Food and Agriculture Organization; United Nations Educational, Scientific and Cultural Organization; International Civil Aviation Organization; World Health Organization; International Telecommunication Union; World Meteorological Organization; International Atomic Energy Agency; Universal Postal Union; Intergovernmental Maritime Consultative Organization; United Nations Industrial Development Organization) concerning Technical Assistance for the Territory of Papua and the Trust Territory of New Guinea
 1968 – Amendments to Articles 23, 27 and 61 of the Charter of the United Nations of 26 June 1945
 1968 – International Grains Arrangement 1967 comprising the Wheat Trade Convention and Food Aid Convention
 1968 – Agreement between the Government of the Argentine Republic, the Government of the Commonwealth of Australia, the Government of Canada, the Government of the United Kingdom of Great Britain and Northern Ireland, and the Government of the United States of America relating to Cereals
 1968 – Exchange of Notes constituting an Agreement between the Government of Australia and the Government of the United States of America to amend the Agreement relating to the Establishment of a United States Naval Communications Station in Australia of 9 May 1963
 1968 – Agreement establishing a Cultural and Social Centre for the Asian and Pacific Region
 1968 – Protocol required by Article 8(1)(e)(ii) of the Convention for the Establishment of a European Organisation for the Development and Construction of Space Vehicle Launchers [ELDO] of 29 March 1962 concerning the Use of Technical Information for Purposes not within the Field of Space Technology
 1968 – International Coffee Agreement, 1968
 1968 – International Convention on Load Lines, 1966
 1968 – Agreement between the Governments of Australia, Canada, Federal Republic of Germany, India, Italy, Japan, the Netherlands, Pakistan, the Philippines, the United Kingdom of Great Britain and Northern Ireland and the Royal Government of Cambodia on Administrative Arrangements for the Prek Thnot (Cambodia) Power and Irrigation Development Project
 1968 – Exchange of Notes constituting an Agreement between the Government of Australia and the Government of the United Kingdom of Great Britain and Northern Ireland on the Guarantee by the United Kingdom [on the value of sterling] and the Maintenance of the Minimum Sterling Proportion [of overseas reserves] by Australia [Sterling Area Agreement]
 1968 – Amendments to the Convention establishing an International Organization of Legal Metrology of 12 October 1955
 1968 – Fourth Procès-Verbal extending the Declaration on the Provisional Accession of Tunisia to the General Agreement on Tariffs and Trade of 12 November 1959
 1968 – Third Procès-Verbal extending the Declaration on the Provisional Accession of the United Arab Republic to the General Agreement on Tariffs and Trade of 13 November 1962
 1968 – Amendment to Article 28 of the Convention on the Intergovernmental Maritime Consultative Organization of 6 March 1948
 1968 – Amendment to Article V of the Constitution of the United Nations Educational, Scientific and Cultural Organization of 16 November 1945 (Paris, 4 November 1968)
 1968 – Amendments to the Schedule to the International Convention for the Regulation of Whaling of 2 December 1946 (Tokyo, 28 June 1968)
 1969 – International Sugar Agreement, 1968
 1969 – Protocol on the Authentic Trilingual Text of the Convention on International Civil Aviation of 7 December 1944
 1969 – Basic Agreement between the Government of Australia and the World Health Organization for the Provision of Technical Advisory Assistance to the Territory of Papua and the Trust Territory of New Guinea, and Exchange of Letters
 1969 – Agreement terminating the Commonwealth Telegraphs Agreements of 11 May 1948 and 25 July 1963
 1969 – Commonwealth Telecommunications Organisation Financial Agreement
 1969 – Universal Copyright Convention, and Protocols 1, 2 and 3
 1969 – Asian-Oceanic Postal Convention, and Detailed Regulations
 1969 – Berne Convention for the Protection of Literary and Artistic Works of 9 September 1886, as revised 13 November 1908, completed 20 March 1914, revised 2 June 1928 and revised 26 June 1948
 1969 – Agreement establishing a Food and Fertiliser Technology Centre for the Asian and Pacific Region
 1969 – Agreement between the Royal Hellenic Government of the one part and the Governments of Australia, Canada, India, New Zealand, Pakistan, South Africa and the United Kingdom of Great Britain and Northern Ireland of the other part concerning the Graves of Members of the Armed Forces of the Commonwealth in Greek Territory
 1969 – Agreement between the Commonwealth of Australia and the European Organisation for the Development and Construction of Space Vehicle Launchers concerning the Use, Maintenance, Administration and Disposal of Facilities
 1969 – Agreement on Fisheries between the Commonwealth of Australia and Japan
 1969 – Customs Convention on the Temporary Importation of Scientific Equipment
 1969 – Agreement between the Government of Australia and the Government of the United States of America relating to the Establishment of a Joint Defence Space Communications Station in Australia [Nurrungar SA]
 1969 – European Convention on Customs Treatment of Pallets Used in International Transport
 1969 – Amendment to Article I(a) of the Plant Protection Agreement for the South East Asia and Pacific Region of 27 February 1956
 1969 – Fifth Procès-Verbal extending the Declaration on the Provisional Accession of Tunisia to the General Agreement on Tariffs and Trade of 12 November 1959
 1969 – Fourth Procès-Verbal extending the Declaration on the Provisional Accession of the United Arab Republic to the General Agreement on Tariffs and Trade of 13 November 1962
 1969 – Fourth Procès-Verbal extending the Declaration on the Provisional Accession of the United Arab Republic to the General Agreement on Tariffs and Trade of 13 November 1962
 1969 – Protocol relating to Negotiations for the Establishment of New Schedule III – Brazil – to the General Agreement on Tariffs and Trade of 30 October 1947
 1969 – Fifth Protocol of Rectifications and Modifications to the Texts of the Schedules to the General Agreement on Tariffs and Trade of 30 October 1947
 1969 – Sixth Protocol of Rectifications and Modifications to the Texts of the Schedules to the General Agreement on Tariffs and Trade of 30 October 1947
 1969 – Seventh Protocol of Rectifications and Modifications to the Texts of the Schedules to the General Agreement on Tariffs and Trade of 30 October 1947
 1969 – Eighth Protocol of Rectifications and Modifications to the Texts of the Schedules to the General Agreement on Tariffs and Trade of 30 October 1947
 1969 – Ninth Protocol of Rectifications and Modifications to the Texts of the Schedules to the General Agreement on Tariffs and Trade of 30 October 1947
 1969 – Amendment to Article XXII of the Constitution of the Food and Agriculture Organization of the United Nations of 16 October 1945 (Rome, 24 November 1969)
 1969 – Amendments to the Schedule to the International Convention for the Regulation of Whaling of 2 December 1946 (London, 27 June 1969)

1970–1979 multilateral treaties 
 1970 – Agreement between the Government of the Commonwealth of Australia and the European Space Research Organisation for the Provision and Operation of Trials Facilities at Woomera for Launching of a Skylark Rocket in January/February 1970
 1970 – Exchange of Notes constituting an Agreement between the Government of Australia and the Government of the United States of America concerning Space Vehicle Tracking and Communications Facilities
 1970 – Arrangement concerning certain Dairy Products
 1970 – ILO Convention (No. 99) concerning Minimum Wage Fixing Machinery in Agriculture
 1970 – Agreement establishing an Economic Cooperation Centre for the Asian and Pacific Region
 1970 – Agreement between the Government of the Commonwealth of Australia and the European Space Research Organisation for the Provision and Operation of Trials Facilities at Woomera for Launching Skylark Rockets
 1970 – Protocol extending the Long-Term Arrangement regarding International Trade in Cotton Textiles of 9 February 1962
 1970 – ILO Convention (No. 122) concerning Employment Policy
 1970 – Convention on the International Hydrographic Organization
 1970 – Sixth Procès-Verbal extending the Declaration on the Provisional Accession of Tunisia to the General Agreement on Tariffs and Trade of 12 November 1959
 1970 – Fifth Procès-Verbal extending the Declaration on the Provisional Accession of the United Arab Republic to the General Agreement on Tariffs and Trade of 13 November 1962
 1970 – Revised Text of Annex II to the Agreement on North Atlantic Ocean Stations of 25 February 1954 (5 June 1968)
 1970 – Amendments to the Schedule to the International Convention for the Regulation of Whaling of 2 December 1946 (London, 26 June 1970)
 1971 – Agreement between the Government of the Commonwealth of Australia and the Government of the United Kingdom of Great Britain and Northern Ireland to provide for the Establishment and Operation of a Large Optical Telescope
 1971 – Fourth International Tin Agreement
 1971 – International Wheat Agreement, 1971
 1971 – Protocol to amend the Agreement on North Atlantic Ocean Stations of 25 February 1954
 1971 – Convention on the Organisation for Economic Co-operation and Development [OECD], and Supplementary Protocols 1 and 2
 1971 – Customs Convention on the Temporary Importation of Pedagogic Material
 1971 – Agreement establishing a Registry of Scientific and Technical Services for the Asian and Pacific Region
 1971 – Asian-Oceanic Postal Convention, Final Protocol and Detailed Regulations
 1971 – Cultural Agreement between the Government of the Commonwealth of Australia and the Government of the Republic of India
 1971 – ILO Convention (No. 47) concerning the Reduction of Hours of Work to Forty a Week
 1971 – Five Power Defence Arrangements
 1971 – Agreement between the Government of the Commonwealth of Australia and the Government of the Republic of South Africa concerning an International Observer Scheme for Land-Based Whaling Stations
 1971 – Amendments to Articles V and VII of the Constitution of the Food and Agriculture Organization of the United Nations of 16 October 1945 (Rome, 19 November 1971)
 1972 – Convention on Transit Trade of Land-locked States
 1972 – ILO Convention (No. 112) concerning the Minimum Age for Admission to Employment as Fishermen
 1972 – Paris Convention for the Protection of Industrial Property of 20 March 1883
 1972 – Berne Convention for the Protection of Literary and Artistic Works of 9 September 1886, completed at Paris on 4 May 1896, revised at Berlin on 13 November 1908, completed at Berne on 20 March 1914, revised at Rome on 2 June 1928, revised at Brussels on 26 June 1948, and revised at Stockholm on 14 July 1967
 1972 – Nice Agreement concerning the International Classification of Goods and Services for the Purposes of the Registration of Marks of 15 June 1957, as revised at Stockholm on 14 July 1967
 1972 – Convention establishing the World Intellectual Property Organization [WIPO]
 1972 – Convention for the Suppression of Unlawful Seizure of Aircraft [Hijacking Convention]
 1972 – Exchange of Notes constituting an Agreement between the Government of Australia and the Government of the United Kingdom of Great Britain and Northern Ireland concerning the Establishment of a Station to Monitor Compliance with the Partial Test Ban Treaty [of 5 August 1963]
 1972 – ILO Convention (No. 123) concerning the Minimum Age for Admission to Employment Underground in Mines
 1972 – Amendment to Article V of the Constitution of the United Nations Educational, Scientific and Cultural Organization of 16 November 1945 (Paris, 24 October 1972)
 1972 – Amendments to Articles IV and VIII of the Constitution of the United Nations Educational, Scientific and Cultural Organization of 16 November 1945 (Paris, 30 October 1972)
 1972 – Amendments to the Schedule to the International Convention for the Regulation of Whaling of 2 December 1946 (London, 30 June 1972)
 1973 – Protocol relating to an Amendment to Article 50(a) of the Convention on International Civil Aviation of 7 December 1944
 1973 – Treaty on the Non-Proliferation of Nuclear Weapons
 1973 – Treaty on the Prohibition of the Emplacement of Nuclear Weapons and other Weapons of Mass Destruction on the Sea-Bed and the Ocean Floor and in the Subsoil Thereof
 1973 – Agreement relating to the International Telecommunications Satellite Organization (”INTELSAT")
 1973 – Vienna Convention on Consular Relations
 1973 – Statute of the International Institute for the Unification of Private Law (UNIDROIT), as amended (Rome, 15 March 1940)
 1973 – Agreement terminating the Commonwealth Telecommunications Organisation Financial Agreement of 27 January 1969
 1973 – Agreement establishing the South Pacific Bureau for Economic Co-operation
 1973 – Protocol relating to Milk Fat
 1973 – Agreement relating to Refugee Seamen
 1973 – Convention on Nomenclature for the Classification of Goods in Customs Tariffs, as amended 16 June 1960
 1973 – ILO Convention (No. 2) concerning Unemployment
 1973 – Protocol to amend the Agreement on North Atlantic Ocean Stations of 25 February 1954, as amended 13 May 1970
 1973 – Convention for the Suppression of Unlawful Acts against the Safety of Civil Aviation
 1973 – International Coffee Agreement of 18 March 1968 as extended
 1973 – Statute of The Hague Conference on Private International Law
 1973 – Amendment to Article 61 of the Charter of the United Nations of 26 June 1945
 1973 – Agreement between the Government of the Commonwealth of Australia and the Government of the Republic of Indonesia establishing Certain Seabed Boundaries
 1973 – Agreement between the Government of the Commonwealth of Australia and the Government of the Republic of Indonesia establishing Certain Seabed Boundaries in the Area of the Timor and Arafura Seas, supplementary to the Agreement of 18 May 1971
 1973 – Agreement concerning the Voluntary Contributions to be Given for the Execution of the Project to Preserve Borobudur
 1973 – Amendments to Article VI of the Statute of the International Atomic Energy Agency of 26 October 1956
 1973 – Protocol relating to the Status of Refugees
 1973 – International Cocoa Agreement, 1972
 1973 – Protocol to Amend the Convention Signed at Paris on the 22nd of November 1928 Relating to International Exhibitions
 1973 – International Sugar Agreement, 1973
 1973 – Amendment to Article V of the Constitution of the Food and Agriculture Organization of the United Nations of 16 October 1945 (Rome, 16 November 1973)
 1973 – Amendments to the Schedule to the International Convention for the Regulation of Whaling of 2 December 1946 (London, 29 June 1973)
 1974 – Vienna Convention on the Law of Treaties
 1974 – ILO Convention (No. 87) concerning Freedom of Association and Protection of the Right to Organise
 1974 – ILO Convention (No. 98) concerning the Application of the Principles of the Right to Organise and to Bargain Collectively
 1974 – Convention for the Protection of Producers of Phonograms against Unauthorised Duplication of their Phonograms
 1974 – Arrangement regarding International Trade in Textiles
 1974 – Protocols for the Extension of the Wheat Trade Convention and Food Aid Convention constituting the International Wheat Agreement of 20 February 1971
 1974 – ILO Convention (No. 111) concerning Discrimination in respect of Employment and Occupation
 1974 – ILO Convention (No. 131) concerning Minimum Wage Fixing, with Special Reference to Developing Countries
 1974 – ILO Convention (No. 83) concerning the Application of International Labour Standards to Non-Metropolitan Territories
 1974 – ILO Convention (No. 86) concerning the Maximum Length of Contracts of Employment of Indigenous Workers
 1974 – Agreement between Australia and the International Atomic Energy Agency for the Application of Safeguards in connection with the Treaty on the Non-Proliferation of Nuclear Weapons of 1 July 1968
 1974 – Protocol suspending Safeguards applied in Australia under the Agreement between the International Atomic Energy Agency, the Government of Australia and the Government of the United States of America for the Application of Safeguards pursuant to the Treaty on the Non-Proliferation of Nuclear Weapons of 1 July 1968
 1974 – Convention relating to the Status of Stateless Persons
 1974 – Second Nam Ngum Development Fund Agreement, 1974
 1974 – Protocol instituting a Conciliation and Good Offices Commission for the Settlement of Disputes arising between Parties to the Convention against Discrimination in Education of 15 December 1960
 1974 – Protocol for the Accession of Hungary to the General Agreement on Tariffs and Trade of 30 October 1947
 1974 – Declaration on the Provisional Accession of the Philippines to the General Agreement on Tariffs and Trade of 30 October 1947
 1974 – Agreement concerning the Continuing Relationship between Australia and the European Organisation for the Development and Construction of Space Vehicle Launchers
 1974 – Protocol relating to an Amendment to Article 56 of the Convention on International Civil Aviation of 7 December 1944
 1974 – Instrument for the Amendment of the Constitution of the International Labour Organization of 28 June 1919, as amended
 1974 – Guarantee Agreement (Second Power Project) between Australia and the International Bank for Reconstruction and Development relating to a Loan from the Bank to the Government of Papua New Guinea
 1974 – Amendments to the Schedule to the International Convention for the Regulation of Whaling of 2 December 1946 (London, 28 June 1974)
 1975 – Exchange of Notes constituting an Agreement between the Government of Australia and the Government of the United States of America further amending the Agreement relating to the Establishment of a United States Naval Communication Station in Australia of 9 May 1963 (NW Cape)
 1975 – Convention on International Liability for Damage Caused by Space Objects (London, Moscow, Washington, 29 March 1972)
 1975 – International Convention on the Simplification and Harmonization of Customs Procedures
 1975 – Convention on the Political Rights of Women
 1975 – Protocol relating to Refugee Seamen
 1975 – Amendments to Articles 24 and 25 of the Constitution of the World Health Organization of 22 July 1946
 1975 – International Telecommunication Convention, Final Protocol, Additional Protocols I-VI, and Optional Additional Protocol
 1975 – Convention on the Recognition and Enforcement of Foreign Arbitral Awards
 1975 – Protocol for the Accession of the People's Republic of Bangladesh to the General Agreement on Tariffs and Trade of 30 October 1947
 1975 – ILO Convention (No. 137) concerning the Social Repercussions of New Methods of Cargo Handling in Docks
 1975 – Statutes of the International Centre for the Study of the Preservation and Restoration of Cultural Property of 5 December 1956, as amended 24 April 1963 and 12 April 1973
 1975 – Protocols for the Further Extension of the Wheat Trade Convention and Food Aid Convention constituting the International Wheat Agreement of 20 February 1971
 1975 – Protocol amending the Single Convention on Narcotic Drugs of 30 March 1961
 1975 – Protocol for the Continuation in Force of the International Coffee Agreement of 18 March 1968, as extended
 1975 – Agreement establishing the Association of Iron Ore Exporting Countries [APEF]
 1975 – Agreement establishing the International Bauxite Association [IBA]
 1975 – International Convention on the Elimination of all Forms of Racial Discrimination
 1975 – Strasbourg Agreement Concerning the International Patent Classification
 1975 – An Agreement to Establish the Intergovernmental Council of Copper Exporting Countries (CIPEC), as amended June 1974
 1975 – Agreement on Implementation of Article VI of the General Agreement on Tariffs and Trade of 30 October 1947 [Anti-Dumping Code]
 1975 – ILO Convention (No. 100) concerning Equal Remuneration for Men and Women Workers for Work of Equal Value
 1975 – Convention on the Reduction of Statelessness
 1975 – Convention for the Protection of the World Cultural and Natural Heritage
 1975 – Convention on Wetlands of International Importance especially as Waterfowl Habitat
 1975 – General Act of Arbitration for the Pacific Settlement of International Disputes
 1975 – Statute of the International Court of Justice
 1975 – Protocol relating to an Amendment to Article 48(a) of the Convention on International Civil Aviation of 7 December 1944
 1975 – Amendments to the Convention of the World Meteorological Organization of 11 October 1947 (Geneva, 20 May 1975)
 1975 – Amendments to Articles V and VI of the Constitution of the Food and Agriculture Organization of the United Nations of 16 October 1945 (Rome, 26 November 1975)
 1975 – Amendments to the Schedule to the International Convention for the Regulation of Whaling of 2 December 1946 (London, 27 June 1975)
 1976 – Annex E.4. (concerning drawback) to the International Convention on the Simplification and Harmonization of Customs Procedures of 18 May 1973
 1976 – International Covenant on Economic, Social and Cultural Rights
 1976 – Supplementary Agreement, 1976, to Second Nam Ngum Development Fund Agreement of 26 June 1974
 1976 – Customs Convention on Containers, 1972, and Protocol of Signature
 1976 – ILO Convention (No. 81) concerning Labour Inspection in Industry and Commerce
 1976 – Protocols for the Third Extension of the Wheat Trade Convention and Food Aid Convention constituting the International Wheat Agreement, 1971
 1976 – Agreement for the Establishment of a Regional Animal Production and Health Commission for Asia, the Far East and the South-West Pacific
 1976 – Exchange of Letters constituting an Agreement between the Government of Australia and the Asian Development Bank concerning an Australian Contribution to the Technical Assistance Special Fund
 1976 – Fifth International Tin Agreement
 1976 – International Cocoa Agreement, 1975
 1976 – International Coffee Agreement 1976
 1976 – Convention on International Trade in Endangered Species of Wild Fauna and Flora [CITES]
 1976 – Extension of the International Sugar Agreement of 13 October 1973
 1976 – Amendments to Article V of the Constitution of the United Nations Educational, Scientific and Cultural Organization of 16 November 1945 (Nairobi, 8 November 1976)
 1976 – Amendments to the Schedule to the International Convention for the Regulation of Whaling of 2 December 1946 (Cambridge, 25 June 1976)
 1977 – Amendments to Articles 5, 11 and 16 of the Statute of the International Institute for the Unification of Private Law (UNIDROIT) of 15 March 1940
 1977 – Universal Postal Union: Second Additional Protocol to the Constitution of 10 July 1964; General Regulations, and Final Protocol; Universal Postal Convention, Final Protocol, and Detailed Regulations; Postal Parcels Agreement, Final Protocol, and Detailed Regulations
 1977 – Amendments to Articles 34 and 55 of the Constitution of the World Health Organization of 22 July 1946
 1977 – Exchange of Letters constituting an Agreement between the Government of Australia and the Asian Development Bank concerning the Transfer to the Asian Development Fund of Australia's Contribution to the Multi-Purpose Special Fund
 1977 – Asian-Oceanic Postal Convention, Final Protocol, and Detailed Regulations
 1977 – Convention on the Prevention and Punishment of Crimes against Internationally Protected Persons, including Diplomatic Agents
 1977 – Convention on the Prohibition of the Development, Production and Stockpiling of Bacteriological (Biological) and Toxin Weapons and on their Destruction
 1977 – Regional Co-operative Agreement for Research, Development and Training related to Nuclear Science and Technology
 1977 – Agreement establishing the International Fund for Agricultural Development
 1977 – Further Extension of the International Sugar Agreement of 13 October 1973
 1977 – Amendments to Articles 29 and 30 of the Agreement establishing the Association of Iron Ore Exporting Countries of 3 April 1975
 1977 – Exchange of Letters constituting an Agreement between the Director-General of the General Agreement on Tariffs and Trade [acting in the name of the Contracting Parties] and the Swiss Federal Authorities relating to the Application to the GATT, by analogy, of the Agreement on Privileges and Immunities of the United Nations concluded between the Secretary-General of the United Nations and the Swiss Federal Council of 19 April 1946
 1977 – Amendments to the Agreement for the Establishment of the Indo-Pacific Fisheries Council of 26 February 1948 Title revised to: Agreement establishing the Indo-Pacific Fishery Commission (IPFC) (11 November 1977)
 1977 – Amendment to Article V of the Constitution of the Food and Agriculture Organization of the United Nations of 16 October 1945 (Rome, 22 November 1977)
 1977 – Amendments to the Schedule to the International Convention for the Regulation of Whaling of 2 December 1946 (Canberra, 24 June 1977)
 1978 – Universal Copyright Convention, as revised, and Protocols 1 and 2
 1978 – Berne Convention for the Protection of Literary and Artistic Works of 9 September 1886, as revised
 1978 – Amendments to the International Convention for the Prevention of Pollution of the Sea by Oil of 12 May 1954
 1978 – International Sugar Agreement, 1977
 1978 – Second Amendment to the Articles of Agreement of the International Monetary Fund of 27 December 1945
 1978 – Exchange of Letters constituting an Agreement between the Government of Australia and the Asian Development Bank concerning an Australian Contribution to the Technical Assistance Special Fund
 1978 – 1978 Protocols for the Fourth Extension of the Wheat Trade Convention and Food Aid Convention constituting the International Wheat Agreement, 1971
 1978 – Agreement for the Establishment in Paris of an International Wine Office, and Protocol of Signature
 1978 – Declaration on the Provisional Accession of Colombia to the General Agreement on Tariffs and Trade of 30 October 1947
 1978 – Amendments to the Agreement for the Establishment of a Regional Animal Production and Health Commission for Asia, the Far East and the South-West Pacific of 22 June 1973 (Rome, 5 December 1978)
 1978 – Amendments to the Schedule to the International Convention for the Regulation of Whaling of 2 December 1946 (Tokyo, 7 December 1977)
 1979 – Nice Agreement concerning the International Classification of Goods and Services for the Purposes of the Registration of Marks of 15 June 1957, as revised at Stockholm on 14 July 1967 and at Geneva on 13 May 1977
 1979 – Constitution of the Asia-Pacific Telecommunity
 1979 – Agreement between the Government of Australia and the Government of the Republic of Korea concerning Cooperation in Peaceful Uses of Nuclear Energy and the Transfer of Nuclear Material
 1979 – Agreement on an International Energy Program, as amended 5 February 1975 and by subsequent Governing Board decisions to May 1979
 1979 – Convention and Operating Agreement on the International Maritime Satellite Organization (INMARSAT)
 1979 – Agreement between the Government of Australia and the Government of the United Kingdom of Great Britain and Northern Ireland concerning Nuclear Transfers between Australia and the United Kingdom
 1979 – Convention and Operating Agreement on the International Maritime Satellite Organization (INMARSAT)
 1979 – Agreement between the Government of Australia and the Government of the United Kingdom of Great Britain and Northern Ireland concerning Nuclear Transfers between Australia and the United Kingdom
 1979 – Agreement on Fisheries between the Government of Australia and the Government of Japan
 1979 – 1979 Protocols for the Fifth Extension of the Wheat Trade Convention and Food Aid Convention constituting the International Wheat Agreement, 1971
 1979 – Agreement on the Precipitation Enhancement Project (PEP) between the World Meteorological Organization, the Government of Spain and other Member States of the World Meteorological Organization participating in the Experiment
 1979 – World Tourism Organization (WTO) Statutes
 1979 – South Pacific Forum Fisheries Agency Convention
 1979 – Exchange of Letters constituting an Agreement between the Government of Australia and the Asian Development Bank relating to a Further Contribution by the Government of Australia to the Technical Assistance Special Fund
 1979 – Amendments to the Agreement for the Establishment of a Regional Animal Production and Health Commission for Asia, the Far East and the South-West Pacific of 22 June 1973 (Rome, 8 November 1979)
 1979 – [Further amendments to the] Statutes of the International Centre for the Study of the Preservation and Restoration of Cultural Property of 5 December 1956, as amended 24 April 1963 and 12 April 1973 (23 April 1979)
 1979 – Amendment to Article IV of the Constitution of the Food and Agriculture Organization of the United Nations of 16 October 1945 (27 November 1979)
 1979 – Amendments to the Schedule to the International Convention for the Regulation of Whaling of 2 December 1946 (Tokyo, 20 December 1978)

1980–1989 multilateral treaties 
 1980 – Arrangement regarding Bovine Meat
 1980 – Agreement between the Government of Australia and the Government of the Republic of Finland concerning the Transfer of Nuclear Material between Australia and Finland
 1980 – Convention on the International Regulations for Preventing Collisions at Sea, 1972
 1980 – Patent Cooperation Treaty
 1980 – Convention (No. 144) concerning Tripartite Consultations to Promote the Implementation of International Labour Standards
 1980 – International Dairy Arrangement
 1980 – Cultural Agreement between the Government of Australia and the Government of the Republic of the Philippines
 1980 – Agreement on Import Licensing Procedures
 1980 – Agreement between the Patent Office of the Government of Australia and the International Bureau of the World Intellectual Property Organization in relation to the establishment and functioning of the Patent Office of the Government of Australia as an International Searching and International Preliminary Examining Authority under the Patent Cooperation Treaty
 1980 – Protocol Supplementary to the Geneva (1979) Protocol to the General Agreement on Tariffs and Trade
 1980 – Annex F.5. (concerning urgent consignments) to the International Convention on the Simplification and Harmonization of Customs Procedures of 18 May 1973
 1980 – Agreement amending the Agreement establishing the South Pacific Commission of 6 February 1947
 1980 – International Covenant on Civil and Political Rights
 1980 – Protocol to amend the Convention relating to International Exhibitions of 22 November 1928
 1980 – Food Aid Convention, 1980
 1980 – International Natural Rubber Agreement, 1979
 1980 – Agreement concerning the Voluntary Contributions to be given for the Execution of the Project to Preserve and Develop the Monumental Site of Moenjodaro
 1980 – Protocol relating to an Amendment to Article 50(a) of the Convention on International Civil Aviation of 7 December 1944
 1980 – Amendments to the Regulations under the Patent Co-operation Treaty (PCT) of 19 June 1970 (16 June 1980)
 1980 – Amendment to Article V of the Constitution of the United Nations Educational, Scientific and Cultural Organization of 16 November 1945 (Belgrade, 4 October 1980)
 1980 – Amendments to the Schedule to the International Convention for the Regulation of Whaling of 2 December 1946 (Brighton, 26 July 1980)
 1981 – International Convention relating to the Limitation of the Liability of Owners of Sea-Going Ships, and Protocol of Signature
 1981 – International Convention for Safe Containers
 1981 – 1981 Protocols for the Sixth Extension of the Wheat Trade Convention, 1971, and the First Extension of the Food Aid Convention, 1980, constituting the International Wheat Agreement, 1971
 1981 – Universal Postal Union (XVIII Congress): General Regulations, and Final Protocol; Universal Postal Convention, Detailed Regulations and Final Protocol;
 1981 – Agreement on Interpretation and Application of Articles VI, XVI and XXIII of the General Agreement on Tariffs and Trade of 30 October 1947 [Subsidies and Countervailing Duties Code] – Agreement on Interpretation and Application of Articles VI, XVI and XXIII of the General Agreement on Tariffs and Trade of 30 October 1947 (Subsidies and Countervailing Duties Code)
 1982 – International Convention on the Simplification and Harmonization of Customs Procedures: Annex A.1. concerning Customs formalities prior to the lodgement of the Goods declaration, Annex A.2. concerning the temporary storage of goods
 1982 – International Convention on the Simplification and Harmonization of Customs Procedures:International Convention on the Simplification and Harmonization of Customs Procedures: Annex C.1. concerning outright exportation, Annex F.4. concerning Customs formalities in respect of postal traffic
 1982 – Agreement between the Governments of Australia, New Zealand and the United States of America in cooperation with the Committee for the Cooperation of Joint Prospecting for Mineral Resources in South Pacific Offshore Areas relating to the conduct of a Joint Programme of Marine Geoscientific Research and Mineral Resource Studies of the South Pacific Region
 1982 – International Convention for the Suppression of Counterfeiting Currency, and Protocol
 1982 – Convention on the Conservation of Antarctic Marine Living Resources
 1982 – Convention on Psychotropic Substances
 1982 – International Convention on Tonnage Measurement of Ships, 1969
 1982 – Second Agreement to extend the Regional Co-Operative Agreement for Research, Development and Training related to Nuclear Science and Technology of 29 February 1972
 1982 – Exchange of Letters constituting an Agreement concerning Australian Participation in the Multinational Force and Observers, and related documents
 1982 – Agreement on Implementation of Article VI of the General Agreement on Tariffs and Trade
 1982 – Amendments to the Title and Substantive Provisions of the Convention on the Inter-Governmental Maritime Consultative Organization of 6 March 1948
 1982 – Agreement between the Government of Australia and the Government of the Republic of the Philippines concerning Co-operation in Peaceful Uses of Nuclear Energy and the Transfer of Nuclear Material
 1982 – Agreement between the Government of Australia and the European Atomic Energy Community concerning Transfers of Nuclear Material from Australia to the European Atomic Energy Community
 1982 – Sixth International Tin Agreement
 1982 – South Pacific Regional Trade and Economic Cooperation Agreement [SPARTECA]
 1982 – Agreement on Implementation of Article VII of the General Agreement on Tariffs and Trade of 30 October 1947
 1982 – Amendments to Article 7 of the Strasbourg Agreement concerning International Patent Classification of 24 March 1971
 1982 – Amendments to Article 5 of the Stockholm Act of 14 July 1967 and the Geneva Act of 13 May 1977 of the Nice Agreement concerning the International Classification of Goods and Services for the Purposes of the Registration of Marks
 1983 – Agreement on Maritime Delimitation between the Government of Australia and the Government of the French Republic
 1983 – Agreement between the Government of Australia and the Organisation for Economic Co-operation and Development on Privileges and Immunities of the Organisation in Australia, and Exchange of Notes
 1983 – 1983 Protocols for the Further Extension of the Wheat Trade Convention, 1971 and the Food Aid Convention, 1980, constituting the International Wheat Agreement, 1971
 1983 – Convention on the Elimination of All Forms of Discrimination against Women (New York, 18 December 1979)
 1983 – Interim Agreement between the Government of Australia and the Commission for the Conservation of Antarctic Marine Living Resources concerning Certain Privileges and Immunities of the Commission
 1983 – Asian-Pacific Postal Convention, and Final Protocol
 1983 – Agreement Terminating the Commonwealth Telecommunications Organisation Financial Agreement of 30 March 1973
 1983 – International Coffee Agreement, 1983
 1983 – Charter of the Asian and Pacific Development Centre
 1983 – International Convention for the Safety of Life at Sea, 1974
 1983 – Exchange of Letters constituting an Agreement between the Government of Australia and the Multinational Force and Observers to amend the Agreement concerning Australian Participation in the Multinational Force and Obs
 1983 – Protocol of 1978 relating to the International Convention for Safety of Life at Sea of 1 November 1974
 1983 – Amendment to Article 5.2 of the Convention relating to International Exhibitions of 22 November 1928, as revised 30 November 1972
 1983 – Extension of the International Coffee Agreement 1976 (Agreement of 3 December 1975)
 1983 – Amendments to the Plant Protection Agreement for the South East Asia and Pacific Region of 27 February 1956
 1983 – Amendments to Annexes 4 and 6 of the Customs Convention on Containers of 2 December 1972 (12 November 1981)
 1983 – Amendments to the International Regulations for Preventing Collisions at Sea, 1972 [under the Convention on the International Regulations for Preventing Collisions at Sea of 20 October 1972] (London, 19 November 1981)
 1984 – International Convention on Civil Liability for Oil Pollution Damage
 1984 – International Convention Relating to Intervention on the High Seas in Cases of Oil Pollution Casualties
 1984 – Protocol relating to Intervention on the High Seas in Cases of Pollution by Substances Other than Oil, 1973
 1984 – Convention on Prohibitions or Restrictions on the Use of Certain Conventional Weapons which may be deemed to be Excessively Injurious or to have Indiscriminate Effects, and Protocols I, II and III
 1984 – International Convention on Standards of Training, Certification and Watchkeeping for Seafarers, 1978
 1984 – Exchange of Notes constituting an Agreement between the Patent Office of the Government of Australia and the International Bureau of the World Intellectual Property Organization [WIPO] to amend the Agreement of 29 February 1980 in relation to the Establishment and Functioning of the Patent Office of the Government of Australia as an International Searching and International Preliminary Examining Authority under the Patent Co-operation Treaty [of 19 June 1970]
 1984 – Agreement establishing the Association of Tin Producing Countries
 1984 – Amendments to Articles 24 and 25 of the Constitution of the World Health Organization of 22 July 1946
 1984 – International Agreement on Jute and Jute Products, 1982
 1984 – International Convention on the Simplification and Harmonization of Customs Procedures Annex D.1. (concerning rules of origin)
 1984 – Exchange of Notes constituting an Agreement between the Government of Australia and the Commission for the Conservation of Antarctic Marine Living Resources to extend the Interim Agreement concerning Certain Privileges and Immunities of the Commission of 15 August 1983
 1984 – International Convention on Simplification and Harmonization of Customs Procedures Annex E.1. (concerning Customs transit)
 1984 – Convention for the Protection of Cultural Property in the Event of Armed Conflict
 1984 – Convention on the Prohibition of Military or any other Hostile Use of Environmental Modification Techniques
 1984 – International conventionsProtocol amending the International Convention relating to the Limitation of the Liability of Owners of Sea-Going Ships of 10 October 1957
 1984 – Agreement between the Governments of Australia, New Zealand and the United States of America in cooperation with the Committee for the Coordination of Joint Prospecting for Mineral Resources in South Pacific Offshore Areas (CCOP/SOPAC) relating to the Conduct of a Joint Programme of Marine Geoscientific Research and Mineral Resource Studies of the South Pacific Region – Second Phase
 1984 – Amendments to the Convention on the Inter-Governmental Maritime Consultative Organization of 6 March 1948 relating to the Institutionalization of the Committee on Technical Co-operation in the Convention
 1984 – Statutes of the International Centre for the Registration of Serial Publications, as amended 12 October 1976
 1984 – Amendments to Articles 17, 18, 20 and 51 of the convention on the International Maritime Organization of 6 March 1948
 1984 – International Telecommunication Convention, Final Protocol, Additional Protocols I-VII, and Optional Additional Protocol
 1984 – Amendments to Articles 6, 7 and 8 of the Convention establishing the World Intellectual Property Organization of 14 July 1967
 1984 – Amendments to Articles 13 and 14 of the Stockholm Act of 14 July 1967 to the Paris Convention for the Protection of Industrial Property
 1984 – Amendments to Articles 53 and 54 of the Patent Cooperation Treaty of 19 June 1970
 1984 – Amendments to Articles 22 and 23 of the Paris Act of 14 July 1971 of the Berne Convention for the Protection of Literary and Artistic Works
 1984 – Amendments to Chapter II-1 of the Protocol of 17 February 1978 relating to the International Convention for the Safety of Life at Sea of 1 November 1974 (London, 20 November 1981)
 1985 – Convention concerning the International Exchange of Publications
 1985 – Convention concerning the Exchange of Official Publications and Government Documents between States
 1985 – International Convention on the Simplification and Harmonization of Customs Procedures Annex A.3. (concerning Customs formalities applicable to commercial means of transport)
 1985 – International Sugar Agreement 1984
 1985 – Convention on the Recovery Abroad of Maintenance
 1985 – Second Agreement to Extend the Agreement establishing the Asian Regional Co-operative Project on Food Irradiation
 1985 – International Convention on the Prevention of Marine Pollution by Dumping of Wastes and Other Matter
 1985 – Constitution of the United Nations Industrial Development Organisation
 1985 – Agreement establishing an International Foot and Mouth Disease Vaccine Bank
 1985 – Convention on the Recognition of Divorces and Legal Separations
 1985 – Regional Convention on the Recognition of Studies, Diplomas and Degrees in Higher Education in Asia and the Pacific
 1985 – Amendment to Article 11.2(a) of the Constitution of the Asia-Pacific Telecommunity of 27 March 1976
 1985 – Amendments to the Agreement establishing the South Pacific Bureau for Economic Co-operation of 17 April 1973
 1985 – Amendment to Article IX.3 to the Agreement establishing the South Pacific Bureau for Economic Co-operation of 17 April 1973
 1985 – Amendments to Annexes 1, 5, 6 and 7 of the Customs Convention on Containers of 2 December 1972 (18 June 1984)
 1985 – Modifications to [Articles 22(2) and 39(1)(a) of] the Patent Co-operation Treaty (PCT) of 19 June 1970 (Geneva, 3 February 1984)
 1985 – Amendment to [insertion of new Article 25bis into] the Customs Convention on the Temporary Importation of Private Road Vehicles of 4 June 1954 (New York, 23 July 1984)
 1986 – ILO Convention (No. 142) concerning Vocational Guidance and Vocational Training in the Development of Human Resources
 1986 – ILO Convention (No. 150) concerning Labour Administration: Role, Functions and Organisation
 1986 – Convention on Registration of Objects Launched into Outer Space
 1986 – Agreement on the Rescue of Astronauts, the Return of Astronauts and the Return of Objects Launched into Outer Space (London, Moscow and Washington, 22 April 1968)
 1986 – Exchange of Letters constituting an Agreement between the Government of Australia and the Multinational Force and Observers (MFO) concerning the extension of Australian Participation in the MFO of 16 March 1982
 1986 – Agreement on the Privileges and Immunities of the International Atomic Energy Agency
 1986 – Agreement between the Government of Australia and the International Bank for Reconstruction and Development and the International Development Association for the Cofinancing of Development Projects
 1986 – Convention on Facilitation of International Maritime Traffic
 1986 – Agreement Governing the Activities of States on the Moon and other Celestial Bodies (New York, 18 December 1979)
 1986 – Convention on the Recognition of Studies, Diplomas and Degrees concerning Higher Education in the States belonging to the Europe Region
 1986 – Convention on the Conflicts of Laws relating to the Form of Testamentary Dispositions
 1986 – Headquarters Agreement between the Government of Australia and the Commission for the Conservation of Antarctic Marine Living Resources
 1986 – Memorandum of Understanding to confer upon the Committee for Co-ordination of Joint Prospecting for Mineral Resources in South Pacific Offshore Areas status as an Intergovernmental Organisation
 1986 – Protocol to amend the Convention on Wetlands of International Importance especially as Waterfowl Habitat of 2 February 1971
 1986 – International Convention on Maritime Search and Rescue, 1979
 1986 – South Pacific Nuclear Free Zone Treaty (Rarotonga, 6 August 1985)
 1986 – Amendments to Annex I [Regulations for the Prevention of Pollution by Oil] of the Protocol of 17 February 1978 relating to the International Convention for the Prevention of Pollution from Ships of 2 November 1973 (London, 7 September 1984)
 1986 – Amendments to the Annex to the Convention on Facilitation of International Maritime Traffic of 9 April 1965, as amended (London, 5 March 1986)
 1986 – Amendments to the Agreement for the Establishment of a Regional Animal Production and Health Commission for Asia, the Far East and the South-West Pacific of 22 June 1973 (Rome, 8 November 1979)
 1987 – Convention on the Civil Aspects of International Child Abduction
 1987 – International Convention on Mutual Administrative Assistance for the Prevention, Investigation and Repression of Customs Offences
 1987 – Agreement between the Government of Australia, the Government of New Zealand and the Government of the United Kingdom of Great Britain and Northern Ireland to Terminate the Nauru Island Agreement of 2 July 1919
 1987 – Budapest Treaty on the International Recognition of the Deposit of Microorganisms for the Purposes of Patent Procedure, as amended 26 September 1980
 1987 – Convention for the Conservation of Antarctic Seals
 1987 – Convention on Early Notification of Nuclear Accident
 1987 – Convention on Assistance in the Case of a Nuclear Accident or Radiological Emergency
 1987 – Convention on the Physical Protection of Nuclear Material
 1987 – Agreement on CAB International
 1987 – Amendment to Article XI.3(a) of the Convention on International Trade in Endangered Species of Wild Fauna and Flora of 3 March 1973
 1987 – Exchange of Letters constituting an Agreement between the Government of Australia and the European Space Agency to amend the Agreement for a Co-operative Space Vehicle Tracking Program of 15 June 1979
 1987 – Amendments to Annex II [Regulations for the Control of Pollution by Noxious Liquid Substances in Bulk] of the Protocol of 17 February 1978 relating to the International Convention for the Prevention of Pollution from Ships of 2 November 1973 [MARPOL 73/78] (London, 5 December 1985)
 1987 – Amendment to Section 8(a) of Article 6 of the Agreement establishing the International Fund for Agricultural Development of 13 June 1976 (Rome, 11 December 1986)
 1987 – Amendments to Articles V and XV of the Constitution of the United Nations Educational, Scientific and Cultural Organization of 16 November 1945 (Paris, 18 November 1987)
 1987 – Amendments to the Schedule to the International Convention for the Regulation of Whaling of 2 December 1946 (Bournemouth, United Kingdom, 26 June 1987)
 1988 – Second Geneva (1987) Protocol to the General Agreement on Tariffs and Trade
 1988 – Acts of the Universal Postal Union
 1988 – International Tropical Timber Agreement, 1983
 1988 – International Sugar Agreement, 1987
 1988 – ILO Convention (No. 160) concerning Labour Statistics
 1988 – Regional Co-operative Agreement for Research, Development and Training related to Nuclear Science and Technology, 1987
 1988 – Vienna Convention for the Protection of the Ozone Layer
 1988 – Protocol of 1978 relating to the International Convention for the Prevention of Pollution from Ships of 2 November 1973, as amended
 1988 – International Convention on the Harmonized Commodity Description and Coding System
 1988 – United Nations Convention on Contracts for the International Sale of Goods
 1988 – International Wheat Agreement 1986
 1988 – Agreement between the Government of Australia and the World Intellectual Property Organization [WIPO] in relation to the functioning of the Patent Office of the Government of Australia as an International Searching and International Preliminary Examining Authority under the Patent Cooperation Treaty [of 11 June 1970]
 1988 – Agreement concerning an International Trust Fund for Tuvalu
 1988 – Convention on the Privileges and Immunities of the Specialized Agencies
 1988 – Treaty on Fisheries between the Government of Certain Pacific Island States and the Government of the United States of America; and Agreed Statement on Observer Programme relating to the Treaty on Fisheries between the Government of Certain Pacific Island States and the Government of the United States of America. of 2 April 1987
 1988 – Agreement among Pacific Island States concerning the Implementation and Administration of the Treaty on Fisheries between the Governments of Certain Pacific Island States and the Government of the United States of America of 2 April 1987
 1988 – Amendments to Annex 6 of the Customs Convention on Containers of 2 December 1972 (8 November 1985)
 1988 – Amendments to the Schedule to the International Convention for the Regulation of Whaling of 2 December 1946 (Auckland, New Zealand, 3 June 1988)
 1989 – International Convention for the Protection of New Varieties of Plants
 1989 – Agreement establishing the Common Fund for Commodities
 1989 – Montreal Protocol on Substances that Deplete the Ozone Layer
 1989 – Convention against Torture and other Cruel, Inhuman or Degrading Treatment or Punishment
 1989 – Agreement between the Government of the United Kingdom of Great Britain and Northern Ireland and the Government of the German Democratic Republic concerning the Treatment of War Graves of Members of the Armed Forces of the United Kingdom of Great Britain and Northern Ireland in the German Democratic Republic
 1989 – Agreement concerning the Mosul War Cemetery
 1989 – Amendments to the Constitution of Intergovernmental Committee on European Migration of 19 October 1953 [Reconstituted as the International Organization for Migration]
 1989 – Amendment to Article VI.A.1 of the Statute of the International Atomic Energy Agency of 26 October 1956, as amended
 1989 – Amendments to the International Regulations for Preventing Collisions at Sea, 1972 [under the Convention on the International Regulations for Preventing Collisions at Sea of 20 October 1972] (London, 19 November 1987)
 1989 – Amendments to the Annex to the Convention on Facilitation of International Maritime Traffic of 9 April 1965, as amended (London, 17 September 1987)
 1989 – Amendments to Annex I [Regulations for the Prevention of Pollution by Oil] of the Protocol of 17 February 1978 relating to the International Convention for the Prevention of Pollution from Ships of 2 November 1973 (London, 1 December 1987)
 1989 – Amendments to Chapter II-1 (concerning Passenger Ro-Ro Ferries) of the International Convention for the Safety of Life at Sea of 1 November 1974 (London, 21 April 1988)
 1989 – Amendments to Articles IV, V, VI and IX of the Constitution of the United Nations Educational, Scientific and Cultural Organization of 16 November 1945 (Paris, 14 November 1989)
 1989 – Amendments to the Annex to the Customs Convention on the A.T.A. Carnet for the Temporary Admission of Goods of 6 December 1961 (26 November 1987)
 1989 – Amendments to the Schedule to the International Convention for the Regulation of Whaling of 2 December 1946 (San Diego, California, USA, 16 June 1989)

1990–1999 multilateral treaties 
 1990 – Convention on the Means of Prohibiting and Preventing the Illicit Import, Export and Transfer of Ownership of Cultural Property
 1990 – Amendments to the Convention on the International Maritime Satellite Organization (INMARSAT) of 3 September 1976
 1990 – Asian-Pacific Postal Union: Constitution; General Regulations; Convention and Final Protocol
 1990 – Agreement to Provide for the Accession of the Government of Australia to the Memorandum of Understanding for the Cooperative Support of the NATO Seasparrow Surface Missile System of 20 May 1977
 1990 – International Convention against the Taking of Hostages
 1990 – Convention for the Protection of the Natural Resources and Environment of the South Pacific Region (SPREP)
 1990 – Protocol concerning Co-operation in Combating Pollution Emergencies in the South Pacific Region [under SPREP]
 1990 – Treaty between the Government of Australia and the Government of the United Kingdom of Great Britain and Northern Ireland concerning the Investigation of Drug Trafficking and Confiscation of the Proceeds of Drug Trafficking
 1990 – Annex V [Regulations for the Prevention of Pollution by Garbage from Ships] to the Protocol of 1978 relating to the International Convention for the Prevention of Pollution from Ships of 2 November 1973 [MARPOL Protocol]
 1990 – Agreement among the Governments of Australia, New Zealand and the United States of America concerning the Continuation of Marine Geoscientific Research and Mineral Resource Studies in the South Pacific Region [Tripartite Phase II Extended Agreement]
 1990 – Protocol for the Suppression of Unlawful Acts of Violence at Airports Serving International Civil Aviation
 1990 – Convention on Conservation of Nature in the South Pacific
 1990 – Amendments to the Commonwealth Telecommunications Organisation Financial Agreement of 30 March 1983
 1990 – Amendments to Article 1(c) and Annex 6 of the Customs Convention on Containers of 2 December 1972 (1 December 1988)
 1990 – Amendments to Annex II [Regulations for the Control of Pollution by Noxious Liquid Substances in Bulk] of the Protocol of 17 February 1978 relating to the International Convention for the Prevention of Pollution from Ships of 2 November 1973 (London, 17 March 1989)
 1990 – Amendments to the Annex to the Convention for the Conservation of Antarctic Seals of 1 June 1972 (London, 16 September 1988)
 1990 – Amendments to Chapter II-1 of the International Convention for the Safety of Life at Sea of 1 November 1974 (London, 28 October 1988)
 1990 – Amendments to the Schedule to the International Convention for the Regulation of Whaling of 2 December 1946 (Noordwijk, Netherlands, 6 July 1990)
 1991 – Convention on the Rights of the Child
 1991 – ILO Convention (No. 156) concerning Equal Opportunities and Equal Treatment for Men and Women Workers: Workers with Family Responsibilities
 1991 – Agreement establishing the South Pacific Applied Geoscience Commission [SOPAC]
 1991 – Treaty between Australia and the Republic of Indonesia on the Zone of Cooperation in an Area between the Indonesian Province of East Timor and Northern Australia [Timor Gap Treaty]
 1991 – Convention on Limitation of Liability for Maritime Claims, 1976 (London, 19 November 1976)
 1991 – Agreement establishing the European Bank for Reconstruction and Development [EBRD]
 1991 – Convention on Celebration and Recognition of the Validity of Marriages
 1991 – ILO Convention (No. 159) concerning Vocational Rehabilitation and Employment (Disabled Persons)
 1991 – Second Optional Protocol to the International Covenant on Civil and Political Rights, Aiming at the Abolition of the Death Penalty
 1991 – Protocol of Amendment to [Article 15.1 of] the International Convention on Mutual Administrative Assistance for the Prevention, Investigation and Repression of Customs Offences of 9 June 1977
 1991 – Convention on the Settlement of Investment Disputes between States and Nationals of other States [ICSID]
 1991 – Amendment to Article I(a) of the Plant Protection Agreement for the Asia and Pacific Region of 27 February 1956, as amended
 1991 – Letter of Notification of Association [of Australia] with the International COSPAS-SARSAT Programme as a Ground Segment Provider
 1991 – Protocol Additional to the Geneva Conventions of 12 August 1949, and relating to the Protection of Victims of International Armed Conflicts [Protocol I]
 1991 – Protocol Additional to the Geneva Conventions of 12 August 1949, and relating to the Protection of Victims of Non-International Armed Conflicts [Protocol II]
 1991 – Convention on the Conservation of Migratory Species of Wild Animals
 1991 – [First] Optional Protocol To The International Covenant on Civil and Political Rights
 1991 – Agreement on a Comprehensive Political Settlement of the Cambodia Conflict
 1991 – International Agreement on Jute and Jute Products, 1989
 1991 – Agreement between the Governments of Australia, the United Kingdom of Great Britain and Northern Ireland, Canada, New Zealand and India, and the Government of the Tunisian Republic concerning Commonwealth War Cemeteries, Graves and Memorials in Tunisia
 1991 – Cooperation Agreement between the Government of Australia and the European Organization for Nuclear Research [CERN] concerning the further Development of Scientific and Technical Cooperation in the Research Projects of CERN
 1991 – Revised Text of the International Plant Protection Convention of 6 December 1951
 1991 – Amendments to Regulations 5 and 6 of Annex V (Regulations for the Prevention of Pollution by Garbage from Ships) to the Protocol of 17 February 1978 relating to the International Convention for the Prevention of Pollution from Ships of 2 November 1973 (London, 17 October 1989)
 1991 – Amendment to the International Regulations for Preventing Collisions at Sea, 1972 [under the Convention on the International Regulations for Preventing Collisions at Sea of 20 October 1972] (London, 19 October 1989)
 1991 – Amendments to Articles V and VII of the Constitution of the United Nations Educational, Scientific and Cultural Organization of 16 November 1945 (Paris, 24 October 1991)
 1991 – Amendments to Articles II, XIV and XVIII [membership by regional economic integration organizations] of the Constitution of the Food and Agriculture Organization of the United Nations of 16 October 1945 (Rome, 18 November 1991)
 1991 – Amendments to the Schedule to the International Convention for the Regulation of Whaling of 2 December 1946 (Reykjavik, Iceland, 31 May 1991)
 1992 – Convention on the Law Applicable to Trusts and on their Recognition
 1992 – Basel Convention on the Control of Transboundary Movements of Hazardous Wastes and their Disposal
 1992 – Agreement on the Importation of Educational, Scientific and Cultural Materials (Florence Agreement)
 1992 – Protocol to the Agreement on the Importation of Educational, Scientific and Cultural Materials of 22 November 1950
 1992 – Agreement to provide for the Accession of the Government of Spain to the Memorandum of Understanding for the Cooperative Support of the NATO Seasparrow Surface Missile System
 1992 – International Telecommunication Regulations
 1992 – ILO Convention (No. 92) concerning Crew Accommodation on Board Ship
 1992 – ILO Convention (No. 133) concerning Crew Accommodation on Board Ship (supplementary provisions)
 1992 – Agreement to extend the Regional Co-operative Agreement for Research, Development and Training related to Nuclear Science and Technology of 2 February 1987
 1992 – International Convention for the Protection of Performers, Producers of Phonograms and Broadcasting Organisations
 1992 – Convention for the Prohibition of Fishing with Long Driftnets in the South Pacific
 1992 – Amendment, and Adjustments, to the Montreal Protocol on Substances that Deplete the Ozone Layer of 16 September 1987
 1992 – Convention on the Taking of Evidence Abroad in Civil or Commercial Matters
 1992 – Amendments to the Protocol of 17 February 1978 relating to the International Convention for the Safety of Life at Sea of 1 November 1974 concerning Radiocommunications for the Global Maritime Distress and Safety System [GMDSS] (London, 10 November 1988)
 1992 – Amendments to the Regulations under the Patent Co-operation Treaty (PCT) of 19 June 1970 (12 July 1991)
 1992 – Amendments to the Regulations under the Patent Co-operation Treaty (PCT) of 19 June 1970 (Geneva, 29 September 1992)
 1992 – Amendments to Chapter II-1 of the International Convention for the Safety of Life at Sea of 1 November 1974 (London, 25 May 1990)
 1992 – Amendments to Chapters II-V and VII of the International Convention for the Safety of Life at Sea of 1 November 1974 (London, 11 April 1989)
 1992 – Amendments to Chapters I, II-1 and III to V (Radiocommunications for the Global Maritime Distress and Safety System) of the International Convention for the Safety of Life at Sea of 1 November 1974 (London, 9 November 1988)
 1992 – Amendments to the Schedule to the International Convention for the Regulation of Whaling of 2 December 1946 (Glasgow, UK, 3 July 1992)
 1993 – Convention for the Mutual Recognition of Inspections in respect of the Manufacture of Pharmaceutical Products
 1993 – ILO Convention (No. 58) fixing the Minimum Age for the Admission of Children to Employment at Sea (Revised 1936)
 1993 – United Nations Convention Against Illicit Traffic in Narcotic Drugs and Psychotropic Substances
 1993 – Exchange of Notes constituting an Agreement between the Government of Australia and the Multinational Force and Observers (MFO) concerning the Resumption of Australian Participation in the MFO
 1993 – International Sugar Agreement, 1992
 1993 – Convention for the Suppression of Unlawful Acts Against the Safety of Maritime Navigation
 1993 – Protocol for the Suppression of Unlawful Acts against the Safety of Fixed Platforms Located on the Continental Shelf
 1993 – Establishment Agreement for the Center for International Forestry Research
 1993 – Third Amendment of the Articles of Agreement of the International Monetary Fund of 27 December 1945
 1993 – Agreement establishing the South Pacific Forum Secretariat
 1993 – Amendment to Article 6 (1) of the Statute of the International Institute for the Unification of Private Law (UNIDROIT) of 15 March 1940, as amended
 1993 – Protocol (SDR Protocol) amending the International Convention for the Unification of Certain Rules of Law relating to Bills of Lading of 25 August 1924 (The Hague Rules), as amended by the Protocol of 23 February 1968 (Visby Rules)
 1993 – Agreement between Australia and the Republic of Nauru for the Settlement of the Case in the International Court of Justice concerning Certain Phosphate Lands in Nauru
 1993 – Exchange of Notes constituting an Implementing Arrangement, concerning International Obligation Exchanges, to the Agreement between the Government of Australia and the European Atomic Energy Community (EURATOM) concerning Transfers of Nuclear Material of 21 September 1981.
 1993 – Niue Treaty on Cooperation in Fisheries Surveillance and Law Enforcement in the South Pacific Region
 1993 – Convention on Biological Diversity
 1993 – International Agreement on the Use of INMARSAT Ship Earth Stations within the Territorial Sea and Ports
 1993 – Convention on Temporary Admission
 1993 – Amendments to Annex I of the Protocol of 17 February 1978 relating to the International Convention for the Prevention of Pollution from Ships of 2 November 1973 [MARPOL 73/78] (London, 4 July 1991)
 1993 – [Further amendments to the] Statutes of the International Centre for the Study of the Preservation and Restoration of Cultural Property of 5 December 1956, as amended 24 April 1963, 12 April 1973 and 23 April 1979 [ICCROM] (21 October 1993)
 1993 – Amendments to Articles II and VII of the Articles of Agreement of the International Finance Corporation [IFC] of 25 May 1955 (28 December 1992)
 1993 – Amendments to Articles IV and V of the Constitution of the United Nations Educational, Scientific and Cultural Organization of 16 November 1945 (Paris, 11 November 1993)
 1993 – Amendments to the Appendix to the Anti-Doping Convention of 16 November 1989 (17 June 1993)
 1994 – United Nations Framework Convention on Climate Change
 1994 – ILO Convention (No. 135) concerning Protection and Facilities to be Afforded to Workers' Representatives in the Undertaking
 1994 – ILO Convention (No. 158) concerning Termination of Employment at the Initiative of the Employer
 1994 – Amendments to Articles 6 and 7 of the Convention on Wetlands of International Importance especially as Waterfowl Habitat, done at Ramsar on 2 February 1971, as amended
 1994 – Convention for the Conservation of Southern Bluefin Tuna
 1994 – Amendment, and Adjustments, to the Montreal Protocol on Substances that Deplete the Ozone Layer of 16 September 1987
 1994 – Amendments to Articles 24 and 25 of the Constitution of the World Health Organization of 22 July 1946
 1994 – Agreement relating to Scientific and Technical Co-operation between Australia and the European Community
 1994 – Asian-Pacific Postal Convention and General Regulations
 1994 – Agreement between the Government of Australia and the Government of the United Kingdom of Great Britain and Northern Ireland providing for the Reciprocal Recognition and Enforcement of Judgments in Civil and Commercial Matters
 1994 – International Telecommunication Union (ITU): Constitution; Convention; Optional Protocol on the Compulsory Settlement of Disputes relating to the ITU Constitution, to the ITU Convention and the Administrative Regulations
 1994 – Fourth Additional Protocol to the Constitution of the Universal Postal Union
 1994 – Agreement between Papua New Guinea and Fiji, Tonga, Solomon Islands, Vanuatu, Australia and New Zealand, concerning the Status of Elements of the Defence Forces of those Countries Deployed in the North Solomons Province of Papua New Guinea as part of the South Pacific Peacekeeping Force
 1994 – United Nations Convention on the Law of the Sea
 1994 – Agreement relating to the Implementation of Part XI of the United Nations Convention on the Law of the Sea of 10 December 1982
 1994 – Anti-Doping Convention
 1994 – Agreement on the Establishment of the International Plant Genetic Resources Institute
 1994 – Amendments to the International Code for the Construction and Equipment of Ships carrying Dangerous Chemicals in Bulk (IBC Code) [in accordance with the Protocol of 17 February 1978 relating to the International Convention for the Prevention of Pollution from Ships of 2 November 1973 [MARPOL 73/78 (London, 30 October 1992)]]
 1994 – Amendments to the Code for the Construction and Equipment of Ships carrying Dangerous Chemicals in Bulk (BCH Code) [in accordance with the Protocol of 17 February 1978 relating to the International Convention for the Prevention of Pollution from Ships of 2 November 1973 [MARPOL 73/78] (London, 30 October 1992)]
 1994 – Amendments to Annexes II-IV of the International Convention for the Safety of Life at Sea of 1 November 1974 (London, 11 December 1992)
 1994 – Amendments to Chapter II-2 of the International Convention for the Safety of Life at Sea of 1 November 1974 (Fire Safety Measures for Existing Passenger Ships) (London, 10 April 1992)
 1994 – Amendments to Chapter II-1 of the International Convention for the Safety of Life at Sea of 1 November 1974 (London, 10 April 1992)
 1994 – Amendments to Chapters II-2, III and V-VII of the International Convention for the Safety of Life at Sea of 1 November 1974 (London, 23 May 1991)
 1995 – International Convention on the Establishment of an International Fund for Compensation for Oil Pollution Damage
 1995 – Protocol to the International Convention on the Establishment of an International Fund for Compensation for Oil Pollution Damage of 18 December 1971
 1995 – Annex III to the Protocol of 17 February 1978 relating to the International Convention for the Prevention of Pollution from Ships of 2 November 1973 (MARPOL 73/78), as amended on 30 October 1992
 1995 – Agreement to Ban Smoking on International Passenger Flights
 1995 – Convention abolishing the Requirement of Legalisation for Foreign Public Documents
 1995 – International Convention on Oil Pollution Preparedness, Response and Co-Operation, 1990
 1995 – ILO Convention (No. 173) concerning the Protection of Workers' Claims in the Event of the Insolvency of their Employer
 1995 – International Bovine Meat Agreement
 1995 – International Grains Agreement, 1995
 1995 – Agreement establishing the South Pacific Regional Environment Programme (SPREP) [as an intergovernmental organisation]
 1995 – Agreement on the Establishment of the Korean Peninsula Energy Development Organization [KEDO]
 1995 – Amendments to the International Regulations for Preventing Collisions at Sea, 1972 [under the Convention on the International Regulations for Preventing Collisions at Sea of 20 October 1972] (London, 4 November 1993)
 1995 – Amendment to Article V of the Constitution of the United Nations Educational, Scientific and Cultural Organization of 16 November 1945 (Paris, 31 October 1995)
 1995 – General Agreement on Tariffs and Trade 1947
 1996 – International Maritime Organization Protocol of 1992 to amend the International Convention on Civil Liability for Oil Pollution Damage of 29 November 1969
 1996 – International Maritime Organization Protocol of 1992 to amend the International Convention on the Establishment of an International Fund for Compensation for Oil Pollution Damage of 18 December 1971
 1996 – International Labour Organization Convention (No. 69) concerning Certification of Ships' Cooks
 1996 – International Labour Organization Convention (No. 73) concerning the Medical Examination of Seafarers
 1996 – International Labour Organization Convention (No. 166) concerning the Repatriation of Seafarers (Revised), 1987
 1996 – Instrument amending the Constitution of the International Telecommunication Union of 22 December 1992
 1996 – Amendment to Article XVII of the Agreement relating to the International Telecommunications Satellite Organization (INTELSAT) of 20 August 1971
 1996 – Second Protocol to the General Agreement on Trade in Services [GATS] of 15 April 1994
 1996 – Third Protocol to the General Agreement on Trade in Services [GATS] of 15 April 1994
 1996 – Agreement for the Establishment of the Indian Ocean Tuna Commission
 1996 – Amendments to the Appendix to the Anti-Doping Convention of 16 November 1989 (31 May 1996)
 1997 – International Tropical Timber Agreement, 1994
 1997 – Convention on the Prohibition of the Development, Production, Stockpiling and Use of Chemical Weapons and on their Destruction
 1997 – Convention on Nuclear Safety
 1997 – Convention for the Pacific Settlement of International Disputes
 1997 – Exchange of Notes constituting an Agreement between the Government of Australia and the Multinational Force and Observers (MFO) to further amend and extend the Agreement concerning Australian Participation in the MFO of 16–17 March 1982, as amended and extended on 4 January 1993
 1997 – Agreement establishing the International Institute for Democracy and Electoral Assistance [International IDEA]
 1997 – Convention on Laundering, Search, Seizure and Confiscation of the Proceeds from Crime
 1997 – Annex B.1. concerning Goods for Display or Use at Exhibitions, Fairs, Meetings or Similar Events, to the Convention on Temporary Admission of 26 June 1990
 1997 – Protocol Additional to the Agreement [of 10 July 1974] between Australia and the International Atomic Energy Agency for the Application of Safeguards in connection with the Treaty on the Non-Proliferation of Nuclear Weapons of 1 July 1968
 1997 – Second Agreement to further extend the Regional Co-operative Agreement for Research, Development and Training related to Nuclear Science and Technology of 2 February 1987
 1997 – Exchange of Notes constituting an Agreement between the Government of Australia and the Government of Japan concerning Cooperation on the Geostationary Meteorological Satellite-5 System
 1997 – Seafarers' Training, Certification and Watchkeeping Code [STCW Code]
 1997 – Amendment to Article V of the Constitution of the United Nations Educational, Scientific and Cultural Organization of 16 November 1945 (Paris, 11 November 1997)
 1998 – International Convention on Salvage, 1989
 1998 – Agreement between the Government of Australia and the International Bureau of the World Intellectual Property Organization [WIPO] in relation to the Functioning of the Australian Patent Office as an International Search
 1998 – Protocol on Environmental Protection to the Antarctic Treaty of 1 December 1959
 1998 – Additional Protocol [Protocol IV on Blinding Laser Weapons] to the Convention on Prohibitions or Restrictions on the Use of Certain Conventional Weapons Which May Be Deemed to Be Excessively Injurious or to Have Indiscriminate Effects of 10 October 1980 (Vienna, 13 October 1995)
 1998 – Fourth Protocol to the General Agreement on Trade in Services of 15 April 1994
 1998 – Montreal Protocol No. 4 to amend the Convention for the Unification of Certain Rules relating to International Carriage by Air, signed at Warsaw on 12 October 1929, as amended by the Protocol done at The Hague on 28 September 1955
 1998 – Protocol concerning the Peace Monitoring Group made pursuant to [and amending] the Agreement between Australia, Papua New Guinea, Fiji, New Zealand and Vanuatu concerning the Neutral Truce Monitoring Group for Bougain
 1998 – Amendments to the Convention on the International Maritime Satellite Organization (INMARSAT) of 3 September 1976
 1998 – Protocol on Prohibitions or Restrictions on the Use of Mines, Booby-Traps and other Devices, as amended (Protocol II, as amended) annexed to the Convention on Prohibitions or Restrictions on the Use of Certain Conventional Weapons which may be Deemed to be Excessively Injurious or to have Indiscriminate Effects of 10 October 1980 (Geneva, 3 May 1996)
 1998 – Agreement on the Network of Aquaculture Centres in Asia and the Pacific, as amended
 1998 – Convention on Protection of Children and Co-operation in respect of Intercountry Adoption
 1998 – Convention establishing the Multilateral Investment Guarantee Agency [MIGA]
 1998 – Protocol relating to an Amendment to Article 3bis of the Convention on International Civil Aviation of 7 December 1944
 1998 – Protocol [insertion of Article 83bis] to the Convention on International Civil Aviation of 7 December 1944
 1998 – Amendments to the International Code for the Construction and Equipment of Ships carrying Dangerous Chemicals in Bulk (IBC Code, vague expressions) [in accordance with the Protocol of 17 February 1978 relating to the International Convention for the Prevention of Pollution from Ships of 2 November 1973 [MARPOL 73/78 (London, 10 March 1997)]]
 1998 – Amendments to the International Code for the Construction and Equipment of Ships carrying Dangerous Chemicals in Bulk (IBC Code) [in accordance with the Protocol of 17 February 1978 relating to the International Convention for the Prevention of Pollution from Ships of 2 November 1973 [MARPOL 73/78 (London, 10 July 1996)]]
 1998 – Amendments to the Code for the Construction and Equipment of Ships carrying Dangerous Chemicals in Bulk (BCH Code) [in accordance with the Protocol of 17 February 1978 relating to the International Convention for the Prevention of Pollution from Ships of 2 November 1973 [MARPOL 73/78 (London, 10 July 1996)]]
 1998 – International Code for Application of Fire Test Procedures [under the auspices of the International Convention for the Safety of Life at Sea [SOLAS] of 1 November 1974] (London, 5 December 1996)
 1998 – International Life-Saving Appliance (LSA) Code [under the auspices of the International Convention for the Safety of Life at Sea [SOLAS] of 1 November 1974] (London, 4 June 1996)
 1998 – Amendments to the Appendix to the Anti-Doping Convention of 16 November 1989 (28 February 1998)
 1999 – Agreement on Mutual Recognition in relation to Conformity Assessment, Certificates and Markings between Australia and the European Community
 1999 – Convention on the Prohibition of the Use, Stockpiling, Production and Transfer of Anti-Personnel Mines and on their Destruction
 1999 – Headquarters Agreement between the Government of Australia and the Commission for the Conservation of Southern Bluefin Tuna
 1999 – Exchange of Notes constituting an Implementing Arrangement between the Government of Australia and the European Atomic Energy Community [EURATOM] concerning Plutonium Transfers under the Agreement between the Government of Australia and EURATOM concerning Transfers of Nuclear Material from Australia to EURATOM, and accompanying Side Letter No. 2, of 21 September 1981, and the Implementing Arrangement concerning Plutonium Transfers of 8 September 1993
 1999 – Fifth Protocol to the General Agreement on Trade in Services of 15 April 1994
 1999 – Amendment to the Montreal Protocol on Substances that Deplete the Ozone Layer of 16 September 1987 (Montreal, 17 September 1997)
 1999 – Convention on Combating Bribery of Foreign Public Officials in International Business Transactions
 1999 – Protocol relating to an amendment to [the final paragraph of] the Convention on International Civil Aviation of 7 December 1944
 1999 – Food Aid Convention, 1999
 1999 – Agreement amending [Article 4(2) of] the Agreement relating to Scientific and Technical Cooperation between Australia and the European Community of 23 February
 1999 – Exchange of Notes constituting an Agreement between the Government of Australia and the Multinational Force and Observers (MFO) concerning Australian Participation in the MFO

2000–2009 multilateral treaties 
 2000 – Protocol of 1988 relating to the International Convention on Load Lines of 5 April 1966
 2000 – Protocol of 1988 relating to the International Convention for the Safety of Life at Sea of 1 November 1974
 2000 – International Convention for the Protection of New Varieties of Plants of 2 December 1961 [UPOV], as revised 10 November 1972, 23 October 1978 and 19 March 1991
 2000 – Instrument amending the Constitution of the International Telecommunication Union of 22 December 1992, as amended 14 October 1994
 2000 – Exchange of Notes constituting an Agreement between the Government of Australia and the United Nations Transitional Administration in East Timor (UNTAET) concerning the continued Operation of the Treaty between Australia and the Republic of Indonesia on the Zone of Cooperation in an Area between the Indonesian Province of East Timor and Northern Australia of 11 December 1989 (Dili, 10 February 2000)
 2000 – Amendments to Articles 3.5 and 9.8 of the Constitution of the Asia-Pacific Telecommunity of 27 March 1976 (Colombo, 29 November 1991)
 2000 – Agreement concerning the Adoption of Uniform Technical Prescriptions for Wheeled Vehicles, Equipment and Parts which can be Fitted and/or be Used on Wheeled Vehicles and the Conditions for Reciprocal Recognition of Approvals Granted on the Basis of these Prescriptions, as amended to 16 October 1995 (Geneva, 20 March 1958)
 2000 – United Nations Convention to Combat Desertification in those Countries Experiencing Serious Drought and/or Desertification, particularly in Africa (Paris, 17 June 1994)
 2000 – Agreement for the Establishment of the International Development Law Institute (IDLO) (Rome, 5 February 1988)
 2000 – Amendments to the International Code for the Construction and Equipment of Ships carrying Dangerous Chemicals in Bulk (IBC Code) [in accordance with the Protocol of 17 February 1978 relating to the International Convention for the Prevention of Pollution from Ships of 2 November 1973 [MARPOL 73/78 (London, 16 March 1990)]]
 2000 – Amendments to the Code for the Construction and Equipment of Ships carrying Dangerous Chemicals in Bulk (BCH Code) [in accordance with the Protocol of 17 February 1978 relating to the International Convention for the Prevention of Pollution from Ships of 2 November 1973 [MARPOL 73/78 (London, 16 March 1990)]]
 2001 – Agreement for the Implementation of the Provisions of the United Nations Convention on the Law of the Sea of 10 December 1982 Relating to the Conservation and Management of Straddling Fish Stocks and Highly Migratory Fish Stocks (New York, 4 December 1995)
 2001 – Agreement Recognising the International Legal Personality of the International Rice Research Institute (Manila: 19 May 1995)
 2001 – Amended Convention on the International Mobile Satellite Organization (London 20 April 1998)
 2001 – Convention on the Safety of United Nations and Associated Personnel (New York, 9 December 1994)
 2001 – Convention to Ban the Importation into Forum Island Countries of Hazardous and Radioactive Wastes and to Control the Transboundary Movement and Management of Hazardous Wastes within the South Pacific Region (Waigani, PNG, 16 September 1995)
 2001 – Protocol Relating to the Madrid Agreement Concerning the International Registration of Marks, 1891
 2002 – Convention on the Recognition and Enforcement of Decisions relating to Maintenance Obligations (The Hague, 2 October 1973)
 2002 – Declaration under the Statute of the International Court of Justice concerning Australia's Acceptance of the Jurisdiction of the International Court of Justice (Canberra, 21 March 2002)
 2002 – Declaration under the United Nations Convention on the Law of the Sea concerning the application to Australia of the Dispute Settlement Provisions of that Convention (Canberra, 21 March 2002)
 2002 – Final Protocol and Partial Revision of the 1998 Radio Regulations, as incorporated in the Final Acts of the World Radiocommunication Conference (WRC-2000) (Istanbul, 2 June 2000)
 2002 – International Convention for the Suppression of Terrorist Bombings (New York, 15 December 1997)
 2002 – International Convention for the Suppression of the Financing of Terrorism (New York, 9 December 1999)
 2002 – Rome Statute of the International Criminal Court (Rome, 17 July 1998)
 2002 – Agreement on the Privileges and Immunities of the International Tribunal for the Law of the Sea (New York, 23 May 1997)
 2003 – Agreement Between Solomon Islands, Australia, New Zealand, Fiji, Papua New Guinea, Samoa and Tonga concerning the Operations and Status of the Police and Armed Forces and Other Personnel Deployed to Solomon Islands to Assist in the Restoration of Law and Order and Security (Townsville, 24 July 2003)
 2003 – Amendments to Articles 16, 17 and 19(B) of the Convention on the International Maritime Organization of 6 March 1948 (London, 4 November 1993)
 2003 – Amendments to the Schedule to the International Convention for the Regulation of Whaling (1946) (Shimonoseki, Japan, 24 May 2002; Cambridge, U.K., 14 October 2002)
 2003 – Convention on Jurisdiction, Applicable Law, Recognition, Enforcement and Co-operation in Respect of Parental Responsibility and Measures for the Protection of Children (The Hague, 19 October 1996)
 2003 – Convention on the Recognition of Qualifications concerning Higher Education in the European Union (Lisbon, 11 April 1997)
 2003 – Convention on the Transfer of Sentenced Persons (Strasbourg, 21 March 1983)
 2003 – Joint Convention on the Safety of Spent Fuel Management and on the Safety of Radioactive Waste Management (Vienna, 5 September 1997)
 2003 – Protocol Concerning the Bougainville Transition Team Made pursuant to the Agreement, done at Port Moresby on 5 December 1997, Between Australia, Papua New Guinea, Fiji, New Zealand and Vanuatu Concerning the Neutral Truce Monitoring Group for Bougainville as amended by the Protocol, done at Port Moresby on 29 April 1998 (Sydney, 30 June 2003)
 2003 – Protocol relating to an Amendment to Article 50(a) of the Convention on International Civil Aviation (Montreal, 26 October 1990)
 2003 – Third Agreement to Extend the 1987 Regional Co-operative Agreement for Research, Development and Training related to Nuclear Science and Technology
 2004 – Agreement establishing the International Organisation of Vine and Wine (Paris, 3 April 2001)
 2004 – Agreement on the Conservation of Albatrosses and Petrels (Canberra, 19 June 2001)
 2004 – Agreement to Promote Compliance with International Conservation and Management Measures by Fishing Vessels on the High Seas (Rome, 24 November 1993)
 2004 – Amendment to the Limitation Amounts in the Protocol of 1992 to Amend the International Convention on Civil Liability for Oil Pollution Damage, 1969 (London, 18 October 2000)
 2004 – Amendment to the Limits of Compensation in the Protocol of 1992 to Amend the International Convention on the Establishment of an International Fund for Compensation for Oil Pollution Damage, 1971 (London, 18 October 2000)
 2004 – Amendments to Article I of the Convention on Prohibitions or Restrictions on the Use of Certain Conventional Weapons which May be Deemed to be Excessively Injurious or to have Indiscriminate Effects (CCW) (New York, 21 December 2001)
 2004 – Amendments to the Agreement and Operating Agreement Relating to the International Telecommunications Satellite Organisation "Intelsat" of 20 August 1971 (Washington, 17 November 2000)
 2004 – Amendments to the Annex to the International Convention for the Safety of Life at Sea (SOLAS), 1974 Contained in Resolutions 1, 2, 6 and 7 of the Conference of Contracting Governments and Including the International Ship and Port Facility Security (ISPS) Code (London, 12 December 2002)
 2004 – Convention on the Conservation of Highly Migratory Fish Stocks in the Western and Central Pacific Ocean (Honolulu. 5 September 2000)
 2004 – International Convention for the Prevention of Pollution from Ships, 1973, as Modified by the Protocol of 1978 Relating thereto Optional Annex IV (London, 13 March 2000)
 2004 – Pacific Agreement on Closer Economic Relations (PACER) (Nauru, 18 August 2001)
 2004 – Protocol Against the Smuggling of Migrants by Land, Sea and Air, Supplementing the United Nations Convention Against Transnational Organised Crime (New York, 15 November 2000)
 2004 – Protocol of 1996 to Amend the Convention on Limitation of Liability for Maritime Claims of 19 November 1976 (London, 2 May 1996)
 2004 – Rotterdam Convention on the Prior Informed Consent Procedure for Certain Hazardous Chemicals and Pesticides in International Trade (Rotterdam, 10 September 1998)
 2004 – Stockholm Convention on Persistent Organic Pollutants (Stockholm, 22 May 2001)
 2004 – United Nations Convention Against Transnational Organized Crime (New York, 15 November 2000)
 2005 – Additional Protocol to the General Regulations of the Asian-Pacific Postal Union Tehran, 18 September 2000
 2005 – Agreement on Mutual Acceptance of Oenological Practices (Toronto, 18 December 2001)
 2005 – Amendment to the Montreal Protocol on Substances that Deplete the Ozone Layer of 16 September 1987 (Beijing, 3 December 1999)
 2005 – Amendments to Annex III to the Rotterdam Convention on the Prior Informed Consent Procedure for Certain Hazardous Chemicals and Pesticides in International Trade, done at Rotterdam on 10 September 1998 (Geneva, 24 September 2004)
 2005 – Amendments to Annexes VIII and IX of the Basel Convention on the Control of Transboundary Movements of Hazardous Wastes and their Disposal, 1992 (Geneva, 29 October 2004)
 2005 – Amendments to Articles 24 and 25 of the Constitution of the World Health Organization (Geneva, 16 May 1998)
 2005 – Fifth Additional Protocol to the Convention of the Universal Postal Union of 10 July 1964 (Seoul, 14 September 1994)
 2005 – ILO Convention (No. 155) concerning Occupational Safety and Health and the Working Environment (Geneva, 22 June 1981)
 2005 – Instruments Amending the Constitution and the Convention of the International
Telecommunications Union (Geneva, 1992) as amended by the Plenipotentiary Conference (Kyoto, 1994) and by the Plenipotentiary Conference (Minneapolis, 1998) (Marrakesh, 18 October 2002)
 2005 – New [Second] Revised Text of the International Plant Protection Convention of 6 December 1951, as revised 28 November 1979 (Rome, 17 November 1997)
 2005 – Protocol relating to an Amendment to Article 56 of the Convention on International Civil Aviation (Montreal, 6 October 1989)
 2005 – Protocol to Prevent, Suppress and Punish Trafficking in Persons, Especially Women and Children, supplementing the United Nations Convention against Transnational Organized Crime (New York, 15 November 2000)
 2005 – Second Additional Protocol to the Constitution of the Asian-Pacific Postal Union Teheran, 18 September 2000
 2005 – Sixth Additional Protocol to the Constitution of the Universal Postal Union of 10 July 1964 (Seoul, 14 September 1999)
 2005 – Treaty of Amity and Cooperation in Southeast Asia (Denpasar, 24 February 1976); Protocol Amending the Treaty of Amity and Cooperation in Southeast Asia (Manila, 15 December 1987); Second Protocol Amending the Treaty of Amity and Cooperation in Southeast Asia (Manila, 25 July 1998)
 2005 – WHO Framework Convention on Tobacco Control (Geneva, 21 May 2003)
 2006 – 1996 Protocol to the Convention on the Prevention of Marine Pollution by Dumping of Wastes and Other Matter of 29 December 1972 (London, 7 November 1996)
 2006 – Agreement Establishing the Pacific Islands Forum Secretariat (Tarawa, 30 October 2000)
 2006 – Agreement for Establishment of the Global Crop Diversity Trust (Rome, 1 April 2004)
 2006 – International Telecommunication Union, World Radiocommunication Conference (WRC-03), Incorporating partial revision of the Radio Regulations of 5 December 1979 (Geneva, 4 July 2003)
 2006 – International Treaty on Plant Genetic Resources For Food and Agriculture (Rome, 3 November 2001)
 2006 – Optional Protocol to the Convention on the Rights of the Child Involvement of Children in Armed Conflict (New York, 25 May 2000)
 2006 – Protocol of Amendment to the International Convention on the Simplification and Harmonization of Customs Procedures (Brussels, 26 June 1999)
 2006 – To the Rotterdam Convention on the Prior Informed Consent Procedure For Certain Hazardous Chemicals and Pesticides In International Trade, Done At Rotterdam on 10 September 1998 (Geneva, 24 September 2004)
 2007 – 2007 Amendments to Appendices I and II of the Convention on International Trade in Endangered Species of Wild Fauna and Flora Done at Washington on 3 March 1973 (The Hague, 15 June 2007)
 2007 – Agreement on Operational and Strategic Cooperation Between Australia and the European Police Office (The Hague, 20 February 2007)
 2007 – Amendments to the Statute of the Hague Conference on Private International Law of 31 October 1951 (The Hague, 30 June 2005)
 2007 – Constitution of the Asia-Pacific Telecommunity (As Amended) (New Delhi 23 October 2002)
 2007 – Convention on the Marking of Plastic Explosives for the Purpose of Detection (Montreal, 1 March 1991)
 2007 – ILO Convention (No. 182) Concerning the Prohibition and Immediate Action for the Elimination of the Worse Forms of Child Labour (Geneva, 17 June 1999)
 2007 – International Convention against Doping in Sport (Paris. 19 October 2005)
 2007 – Protocol on Environmental Protection to the Antarctic Treaty – Measure 4 (2006) Specially Protected Species: Fur Seals (Edinburgh, 23 June 2006)
 2007 – Optional Protocol to the Convention on the Rights of the Child, on the Sale of Children, Child Prostitution and Child Pornography (New York, 25 May 2000)
 2007 – Protocol of 1978 relating to the International Convention for the Prevention of Pollution from Ships 1973 (MARPOL 73–78) as amended by Annexes I and II as adopted (London, 15 October 2004)
 2007 – Protocol of 1997 to amend the International Convention for the Prevention of Pollution from Ships of 2 November 1973, as modified by the Protocol of 17 February 1978 (New Annex VI – Regulations for the Prevention of Air Pollution from Ships), (London, 26 September 1997)
 2007 – Protocol on Preparedness, Response and Co-operation to Pollution Incidents by Hazardous and Noxious Substances (London, 15 March 2000)
 2007 – Protocol V on Explosive Remnants of War to the 1980 Convention on Prohibitions or Restrictions on the Use of Certain Conventional Weapons which may be Deemed to be Excessively Injurious or to have Indiscriminate Effects (Geneva, 28 November 2003)
 2007 – Seventh Additional Protocol to the Constitution (of 10 July 1964) of the Universal Postal Union; the Universal Postal Convention and Final Protocol; the General Regulations of the Universal Postal Union; and the Rules of Procedures of Congress (Bucharest, 5 October 2004)
 2007 – The International Health Regulations (2005) (Geneva, 23 May 2005)
 2007 – World Intellectual Property Organisation Copyright Treaty Geneva (Geneva, 20 December 1996)
 2007 – WIPO Performances and Phonograms Treaty (Geneva, 20 December 1996)
 2008 – Kyoto Protocol to the United Nations Framework Convention on Climate Change (Kyoto, 11 December 1997)
 2008 – Agreement concerning the Establishing of Global Technical Regulations for Wheeled Vehicles, Equipment and Parts which can be Fitted and/or be Used on Wheeled Vehicles (Geneva, 25 June 1998)
 2008 – Convention on the Rights of Persons with Disabilities (New York, 30 March 2007)
 2008 – Extension of the Agreement between the Government of Australia and the International Bureau of the World Intellectual Property Organization in relation to the functioning of the Australian Patent Office as an International Searching Authority and International Preliminary Examining Authority under the Patent (Geneva, 28 September 2007)
 2008 – Headquarters Agreement Between the Government of Australia and the Secretariat to the Agreement on the Conservation of Albatrosses and Petrels (Hobart, 23 June 2008)
 2008 – Instrument amending the Constitution of the International Telecommunication Union (Geneva, 1992) as amended by the Plenipotentiary Conference (Kyoto, 1994), by the Plenipotentiary Conference (Minneapolis, 1998) and by the Plenipotentiary Conference (Marrakesh, 2002) And Instrument amending the Convention of the International Telecommunication Union (Geneva, 1992) as amended by the Plenipotentiary Conference (Kyoto, 1994), by the Plenipotentiary Conference (Minneapolis, 1998) and by the Plenipotentiary Conference (Marrakesh, 2002)
 2008 – International Convention on the Control of Harmful Anti-fouling Systems on Ships, 2001 (London, 5 October 2001)
 2009 – Agreement Between the Government of Australia and the International Bureau of the World Intellectual Property Organization in relation to the Functioning of the Australian Patent Office as an International Searching Authority and International Preliminary Examining Authority under the Patent Cooperation Treaty (Geneva, 16 December 2008)
 2009 – Agreement Between the Government of Australia and the North Atlantic Treaty Organisation on the Security of Information (New York, 26 September 2007)
 2009 – Convention for the Unification of Certain Rules for International Carriage by Air (Montreal, 28 May 1999)
 2009 – Final Acts of the World Radiocommunications Conference (WRC 2007) (Geneva, 16 November 2007)
 2009 – Fourth Agreement to Extend the 1987 Regional Cooperative Agreement for Research, Development and Training related to Nuclear Science and Technology (Vienna, 22 June 2006)
 2009 – International Convention on Civil Liability for Bunker Oil Pollution Damage 2001 (London, 23 March 2001)
 2009 – Measure 1 (2003) Secretariat of the Antarctic Treaty (Madrid, 20 June 2003)
 2009 – Optional Protocol to the Convention on the Elimination of All Forms of Discrimination against Women of 18 December 1979 (New York, 6 October 1999)
 2009 – Optional Protocol to the United Nations Convention on the Rights of Persons with Disabilities (New York, 13 December 2006)
 2009 – Patent Law Treaty (Geneva, 1 June 2000)
 2009 – Singapore Treaty on the Law of Trademarks, Regulations and a Supplementary Resolution by the Diplomatic Conference (Singapore, 27 March 2006 )
 2009 – UNESCO Convention on the Protection and Promotion of the Diversity of Cultural Expressions (Paris, 20 October 2005)

2010–present multilateral treaties 
 2010 – Agreement Establishing the ASEAN-Australia-New Zealand Free Trade Area (Cha-am, Phetchaburi, Thailand, 27 February 2009)
 2010 – Convention on the Service Abroad of Judicial and Extra Judicial Documents in Civil or Commercial Matters (The Hague, 15 November 1965)
 2010 – Protocol additional to the Geneva Conventions of 12 August 1949, and relating to the Adoption of an Additional Distinctive Emblem (Protocol III) (Geneva, 8 December 2005)
 2011 – Agreement between Australia and the European Union on the Security of Classified Information (Brussels, 13 January 2010)
 2011 – Amendment to Annex III of the Rotterdam Convention on the Prior Informed Consent Procedure for Certain Hazardous Chemicals and Pesticides in International Trade (Geneva, 24 June 2011)
 2011 – Statute of the International Renewable Energy Agency (Bonn, 26 January 2009)
 2011 – The Agreement Establishing the Advisory Centre on WTO Law (Seattle, 30 November 1999)
 2012 – 2010 Amendments to Appendices I and II of the Convention on International Trade in Endangered Species of Wild Fauna and Flora done at Washington on 3 March 1973 (Doha, 25 March 2010)
 2012 – Agreement between the Government of Australia and the European Atomic Energy Community (EURATOM) for Co-operation in the Peaceful Uses of Nuclear Energy (Canberra, 5 September 2011)
 2012 – Agreement between the Government of Australia and the European Space Agency for a Co-operative Space Vehicle Tracking Program (Cape Town, 5 October 2011)
 2012 – Agreement for the Establishment of the International Anti-Corruption Academy as an International Organization (Vienna, 2 September 2010)
 2012 – Amendment of the Articles of Agreement of the International Monetary Fund to Enhance Voice and Participation in the International Monetary Fund, Expand the Investment Authority of the International Monetary Fund; Amendment of the Articles of Agreement of the International Bank for Reconstruction and Development to Enhance Voice and Participation in the International Bank for Reconstruction and Development
 2012 – Amendment to Annex 1 of the Agreement on the Conservation of Albatrosses and Petrels (ACAP) of 19 June 2001 (Lima, 27 April 2012)
 2012 – Amendments, done at Bergen on 25 November 2011,to Appendices I and II to the Convention on the Conservation of Migratory Species of Wild Animals (Bonn, 23 June 1979)
 2012 – Convention on Mutual Administrative Assistance in Tax Matters (Strasbourg 25 January 1988)
 2012 – Convention on the Conservation and Management of High Seas Fishery Resources in the South Pacific Ocean (Auckland, 14 November 2009)
 2012 – Exchange of Notes constituting an Agreement to amend the Agreement between the Government of the United States of America and the Government of Australia concerning Space Vehicle Tracking and Communication Facilities of 29 May 1980, as amended (Canberra, 11 January 2012)
 2012 – Exchange of Notes constituting an Agreement to extend the Agreement between the Government of Australia and the Government of the United States of America concerning the Conduct of Scientific Balloon Flights for Civil Research Purposes of 16 February 2006, as amended (Canberra, 24 April 2012)
 2012 – Fifth Agreement to extend the 1987 Regional Cooperative Agreement for Research, Development and Training Related to Nuclear Science and Technology (Bali, 15 April 2011)
 2012 – ILO Convention 162, Asbestos, 1986 (Geneva, 24 June 1986)
 2012 – ILO Convention 175, Part Time Work Convention, 1994 (Geneva, 24 June 1994)
 2012 – International Convention for the Suppression of Acts of Nuclear Terrorism (New York, 13 April 2005)
 2012 – Protocol of 2002 to the Occupational Safety and Health Convention, 1981 (Geneva, 20 June 2002)
 2012 – Second Protocol to the Agreement between Australia and the Republic of Austria on Social Security (Vienna, 17 February 2010)
 2012 – Southern Indian Ocean Fisheries Agreement (Rome, 29 December 2006)
 2012 – Third Protocol Amending the Treaty of Amity and Cooperation in Southeast Asia (Hanoi, 23 July 2010)
 2012 – Universal Postal Union: Eighth Additional Protocol to the Constitution of 10 July 1964, As Amended; Convention and Final Protocol; First Additional Protocol to the General Regulations; Postal Payment Services Agreement (Geneva, 12 August 2008)
 2012 – World Wine Trade Group Agreement on Requirements for Wine Labelling (Canberra, 23 January 2007)
 2013 – 2012 Amendment to Annex I of the International Convention against Doping in Sport (Paris, 1 October 2012)
 2013 – Agreement between Australia and the European Union Amending the Agreement on Mutual Recognition in relation to Conformity Assessment, Certificates and Markings between Australia and the European Community (Brussels, 23 February 2012)
 2013 – Amendments to the Annex of the Protocol of 1978 Relating to the International Convention for the Prevention of Pollution from Ships, 1973 – Resolution MEPC.216(63): Regional arrangements for port reception facilities under MARPOL Annexes I, II, IV and V (London, 2 March 2012)
 2013 – Amendments to the Annex of the Protocol of 1997 to Amend the International Convention for the Prevention of Pollution from Ships, 1973, as Modified by the Protocol of 1978 Relating Thereto – Resolution MEPC.217(63): Regional arrangements for port reception facilities under MARPOL Annex VI and Certification of marine diesel engines fitted with Selective Catalytic Reduction systems under the NOx Technical Code 2008 (London, 2 March 2012)
 2013 – Amendments to the Schedule to the International Convention for the Regulation of Whaling, 1946 (Panama City, 6 July 2012)
 2013 – Amendments, adopted at Bangkok on 14 March 2013, to Appendices I and II of the Convention on International Trade in Endangered Species of Wild Fauna and Flora (Bangkok, 14 March 2013)
 2013 – Convention on Cluster Munitions (Dublin, 30 May 2008)
 2013 – Convention on Cybercrime (Budapest, 23 November 2001)
 2013 – Exchange of notes amending the 2007 Agreement on Operational and Strategic Cooperation between Australia and the European Police Office (The Hague, 27 August 2012 and 29 July 2013)
 2013 – Loan Agreement between Australia and the International Monetary Fund (Tokyo, 13 October 2012)
 2013 – Maritime Labour Convention, 2006 (No. 186) (Geneva, 7 February 2006)
 2013 – Partial Revision of the 2008 Radio Regulations as Incorporated in the International Telecommunication Union Final Acts of the World Radiocommunication Conference (WRC-12) (Geneva, 17 February 2012)
 2013 – Regional Cooperation Agreement on Combating Piracy and Armed Robbery Against Ships in Asia (Tokyo, 11 November 2004)
 2013 – Resolution MEPC.200(62): Amendments to the Annex of the Protocol of 1978 Relating to the International Convention for the Prevention of Pollution from Ships 1973 (Special Area Provisions and the Designation of the Baltic Sea as a Special Area under MARPOL Annex IV) (London, 15 July 2011)
 2013 – Resolution MEPC.201(62): Revised MARPOL Annex V Regulation for the Prevention of Pollution by Garbage from Ships (London, 15 July 2011)
 2013 – Resolution MEPC.203(62): Amendments to MARPOL Annex VI on Regulations for the Prevention of Air Pollution from Ships by Inclusion of New Regulations on Energy Efficiency For Ships (London, 15 July 2011)
 2014 – 2012 Amendments to the International Code for Fire Safety Systems (FSS Code) IMO Resolution MSC.327(90) (London, 25 May 2012)
 2014 – 2012 Amendments to the International Code for Fire Safety Systems (FSS Code) IMO Resolution MSC.339(91) (London, 30 November 2012)
 2014 – 2012 Amendments to the International Code for the Construction and Equipment of Ships Carrying Dangerous Chemicals in Bulk (IBC Code) IMO Resolution MEPC.225(64) (London, 5 October 2012)
 2014 – 2012 Amendments to the International Code for the Construction and Equipment of Ships Carrying Dangerous Chemicals in Bulk (IBC Code) IMO Resolution MSC.340(91) (London, 30 November 2012)
 2014 – 2012 Amendments to the International Code of Safety for High-Speed Craft, 2000 (2000 HSC Code) IMO Resolution MSC.326(90) (London, 24 May 2012)
 2014 – 2012 Amendments to the Performance Standard for Protective Coatings for Cargo Oil Tanks of Crude Oil Tankers IMO Resolution MSC.342(91) (London, 30 November 2012)
 2014 – 2012 Code on Noise Levels on Board Ships IMO Resolution MSC.337(91) (London, 30 November 2012)
 2014 – 2013 Amendment to Annex I of the International Convention Against Doping in Sport of 19 October 2005 (Paris, 27 September 2013)
 2014 – 2014 Amendment to Annex I of the International Convention Against Doping in Sport of 19 October 2005 (20 September 2014)
 2014 – 2014 Amendment to Annex II of the International Convention Against Doping in Sport of 19 October 2005 (15 November 2013)
 2014 – Agreement on the Establishment of the Global Green Growth Institute (Rio de Janeiro, 20 June 2012)
 2014 – Amendment to the Agreement Establishing the South Pacific Commission [Pacific Community]: Resolution, adopted by the 23rd Pacific Conference, modifying the application of Articles III and V-XIII (Saipan, 7 October 1983)
 2014 – Amendment to the Agreement Establishing the South Pacific Commission: Decision, adopted by the 37th Pacific Conference, to change the name of the South Pacific Commission to "the Pacific Community" (Canberra, 21 October 1997)
 2014 – Amendment to the Agreement Establishing the South Pacific Commission: Resolution, Adopted by the Eighth Conference of the Pacific Community, on Extending the Territorial Scope of the Pacific Community to Include Timor-Leste (Suva, 19 November 2013)
 2014 – Amendments, Adopted at London on 17 May 2013, to the Annex of the Protocol of 1978 Relating to the International Convention for the Prevention of Pollution from Ships, 1973 (IMO Resolution MEPC.235(65)) (London, 17 May 2013)
 2014 – Amendments, Adopted at London on 17 May 2013, to the Annex of the Protocol of 1978 Relating to the International Convention for the Prevention of Pollution from Ships, 1973 (IMO Resolution MEPC.236(65)) (London, 17 May 2013)
 2014 – Amendments, Adopted at London on 21 June 2013, to the International Convention for Safe Containers, 1972 IMO Resolution MSC.355(92) (London, 21 June 2013)
 2014 – Amendments, adopted at London on 24 May 2012, to the International Convention for the Safety of Life at Sea, 1974, as amended (Resolution MSC.325(90)) (London, 24 May 2012)
 2014 – Amendments, adopted at London on 24 May 2012, to the Protocol of 1988 relating to the International Convention on Load Lines, 1966, as amended (Resolution MSC.329(90): Southern Winter Seasonal Zone) (London, 24 May 2012)
 2014 – Amendments, adopted on 10 May 2013, to Annex III of the Rotterdam Convention on the Prior Informed Consent Procedure for Certain Hazardous Chemicals and Pesticides in International Trade (Geneva, 10 May 2013)
 2014 – Amendments, adopted on 30 November 2012, to the International Convention for the Safety of Life at Sea, 1974, as amended IMO Resolution MSC.338(91) (London, 30 November 2012)
 2014 – Amendments, adopted on 30 November 2012, to the Protocol of 1978 relating to the International Convention for the Safety of Life at Sea, 1974 IMO Resolution MSC.343(91) (London, 30 November 2012)
 2014 – Amendments, adopted on 30 November 2012, to the Protocol of 1988 relating to the International Convention for the Safety of Life at Sea, 1974 IMO Resolution MSC.344(91) (London, 30 November 2012)
 2014 – Amendments, adopted on 30 November 2012, to the Protocol of 1988 relating to the International Convention on Load Lines, 1966, as amended IMO Resolution MSC.345(91) (London, 30 November 2012)
 2014 – Arms Trade Treaty (New York, 2 April 2013)
 2014 – Food Assistance Convention (London, 25 April 2012)
 2014 – Resolution MEPC.193(61): Amendments to the Annex of the Protocol of 1978 Relating to the International Convention for the Prevention of Pollution from Ships, 1973 (MARPOL) (Revised MARPOL Annex III: Regulations for the Prevention of Pollution by Harmful Substances Carried by Sea in Packaged Form) (London, 1 October 2010)
 2015 – Agreement between Australia and the European Union Establishing a Framework for the Participation of Australia in European Union Crisis Management Operations (Brussels, 22 April 2015)
 2015 – Amendment to Annex 1 of the Agreement on the Conservation of Albatrosses and Petrels (‘ACAP’) of 19 June 2001 (Santa Cruz de Tenerife, 8 May 2015)
 2015 – Amendments to Appendices I and II to the Convention on the Conservation of Migratory Species of Wild Animals (Bonn, 23 June 1979) (Quito, 9 November 2014)
 2015 – Amendments to the Annex of the Protocol of 1997 relating to the International Convention for the Prevention of Pollution from Ships, 1973, as modified by the Protocol of 1978 relating thereto
 2015 – Articles of Agreement for the Asian Infrastructure Investment Bank (Beijing, 29 June 2015)
 2015 – Convention on International Interests in Mobile Equipment (Cape Town, 16 November 2001)
 2015 – ASEAN-Australia-New Zealand Free Trade AreaFirst Protocol to Amend the Agreement Establishing the ASEAN-Australia-New Zealand Free Trade Area (Nay Pyi Taw, 26 August 2014)
 2015 – Protocol to the Convention on International Interests in Mobile Equipment on Matters Specific to Aircraft Equipment (Cape Town, 16 November 2001)
 2016 – 2015 Amendment to Annex 1 of the International Convention Against Doping in Sport (Paris, 22 September 2015)
 2016 – Amendments to the Annex of the Protocol of 1997 relating to the International Convention for the Prevention of Pollution from ships, 1973, as modified by the Protocol of 1978 relating thereto (under Resolutions MEPC 246–248(66)) (London, 4 April 2014)
 2016 – Resolution MSC.366(93) – Amendments to the International Convention for the Safety of Life at Sea, 1974, as amended (London, 22 May 2014)
 2016 – Resolution MSC.373(93) – Amendments to the International Convention on Standards of Training, Certification and Watchkeeping for Seafarers (STCW), 1978 (London, 22 May 2014)
 2016 – Resolution MSC.375(93) – Amendments to the Protocol of 1988 relating to the International Convention on Load Lines, 1966, as Amended (London, 22 May 2014)
 2016 – Resolution A.1083(28) – Amendments to the International Convention on Load Lines, 1966 (London, 4 December 2013)
 2016 – Resolution A.1084(28) – Amendments to the International Convention on Tonnage Measurement of Ships, 1969 (London, 4 December 2013)
 2016 – Resolution A.1085(28) – Amendments to the Convention on the International Regulations for Preventing Collisions at Sea, 1972 (London, 22 May 2014)
 2016 – Resolution MSC.365(93) – Amendments to the International Convention for the Safety of Life at Sea, 1974, as Amended (London, 22 May 2014)
 2016 – Resolution A.1070 (28) IMO Instrument Implementation Code (III CODE) (London, 4 December 2013)
 2016 – Amendments to the Annexes of the Protocol of 1978 relating to the International Convention for the Prevention of Pollution from Ships, 1973 Amendments to MARPOL Annex I RESOLUTION MEPC.256 (67) (London, 17 October 2014)
 2016 – Amendments to the Annexes of the Protocol of 1978 relating to the International Convention for the Prevention of Pollution from Ships, 1973 Amendments to MARPOL Annex III RESOLUTION MEPC.257 (67) (London, 17 October 2014)
 2016 – Amendments to the Annex of the Protocol of 1997 to Amend the International Convention for the Prevention of Pollution from ships, 1973, as modified by the Protocol of 1978 relating thereto Amendments to MARPOL Annex VI RESOLUTION MEPC.258 (67) (London, 17 October 2014)
 2016 – 2015 Amendment to Annex II of the International Convention Against Doping in Sport (Paris, 19 October 2015)
 2016 – Amendments to the International Convention for the Safety of Life at Sea ('SOLAS'), 1974 as amended Resolution MSC.380(94) [Chapters II-2, VI and XI-1 and Appendix] (London, 21 November 2014)
 2016 – Agreement on Port State Measures to Prevent, Deter and Eliminate Illegal, Unreported and Unregulated Fishing (Rome, 22 November 2009)
 2016 – Amendment to the Convention on the Physical Protection of Nuclear Material (VIENNA, 8 JULY 2005)
 2016 – Paris Agreement (Paris, 12 DECEMBER 2015) -
 2016 – Ratification of the Decisions of the 2012 Doha Congress: Universal Postal Union: General Regulations of the Universal Postal Union, Universal Postal Convention and Final Protocol to the Universal Postal Convention and Postal Payment Services Agreement (Doha, 11 October 2012)
 2017 – Consequences of Termination of the Treaty Between Australia and the Democratic Republic of Timor-Leste on Certain Maritime Arrangements In the Timor Sea

References
Unless otherwise stated, all references are to the Australasian Legal Information Institute.

Treaties of Australia
Australia